

608001–608100 

|-bgcolor=#d6d6d6
| 608001 ||  || — || August 12, 2007 || Siding Spring || SSS || Tj (2.98) || align=right | 3.7 km || 
|-id=002 bgcolor=#E9E9E9
| 608002 ||  || — || March 8, 2005 || Mount Lemmon || Mount Lemmon Survey ||  || align=right | 1.5 km || 
|-id=003 bgcolor=#fefefe
| 608003 ||  || — || September 30, 2006 || Mount Lemmon || Mount Lemmon Survey ||  || align=right data-sort-value="0.59" | 590 m || 
|-id=004 bgcolor=#E9E9E9
| 608004 ||  || — || March 10, 2005 || Mount Lemmon || Mount Lemmon Survey ||  || align=right | 1.9 km || 
|-id=005 bgcolor=#E9E9E9
| 608005 ||  || — || November 3, 2007 || Kitt Peak || Spacewatch ||  || align=right | 1.5 km || 
|-id=006 bgcolor=#E9E9E9
| 608006 ||  || — || December 17, 2003 || Kitt Peak || Spacewatch ||  || align=right | 2.7 km || 
|-id=007 bgcolor=#E9E9E9
| 608007 ||  || — || March 19, 2009 || Mount Lemmon || Mount Lemmon Survey ||  || align=right | 2.0 km || 
|-id=008 bgcolor=#E9E9E9
| 608008 ||  || — || September 4, 2011 || Haleakala || Pan-STARRS ||  || align=right | 1.5 km || 
|-id=009 bgcolor=#fefefe
| 608009 ||  || — || October 6, 2002 || Palomar || NEAT ||  || align=right data-sort-value="0.91" | 910 m || 
|-id=010 bgcolor=#fefefe
| 608010 ||  || — || November 19, 2006 || Kitt Peak || Spacewatch ||  || align=right data-sort-value="0.74" | 740 m || 
|-id=011 bgcolor=#fefefe
| 608011 ||  || — || November 17, 2006 || Kitt Peak || Spacewatch ||  || align=right data-sort-value="0.86" | 860 m || 
|-id=012 bgcolor=#fefefe
| 608012 ||  || — || February 13, 2011 || Mount Lemmon || Mount Lemmon Survey ||  || align=right data-sort-value="0.60" | 600 m || 
|-id=013 bgcolor=#E9E9E9
| 608013 ||  || — || April 9, 2014 || Mount Lemmon || Mount Lemmon Survey ||  || align=right | 2.4 km || 
|-id=014 bgcolor=#E9E9E9
| 608014 ||  || — || September 24, 2011 || Catalina || CSS ||  || align=right | 1.8 km || 
|-id=015 bgcolor=#E9E9E9
| 608015 ||  || — || September 24, 2011 || Haleakala || Pan-STARRS ||  || align=right | 1.8 km || 
|-id=016 bgcolor=#E9E9E9
| 608016 ||  || — || October 15, 2002 || Palomar || NEAT ||  || align=right | 1.9 km || 
|-id=017 bgcolor=#FFC2E0
| 608017 ||  || — || October 29, 2002 || Kitt Peak || Spacewatch || APO || align=right data-sort-value="0.38" | 380 m || 
|-id=018 bgcolor=#E9E9E9
| 608018 ||  || — || February 10, 2013 || Haleakala || Pan-STARRS ||  || align=right | 1.9 km || 
|-id=019 bgcolor=#fefefe
| 608019 ||  || — || November 1, 2002 || Haleakala || AMOS ||  || align=right data-sort-value="0.57" | 570 m || 
|-id=020 bgcolor=#E9E9E9
| 608020 ||  || — || September 29, 2002 || Haleakala || AMOS || TIN || align=right | 1.1 km || 
|-id=021 bgcolor=#E9E9E9
| 608021 ||  || — || September 18, 2007 || Mount Lemmon || Mount Lemmon Survey ||  || align=right | 2.2 km || 
|-id=022 bgcolor=#fefefe
| 608022 ||  || — || October 16, 2002 || Palomar || NEAT ||  || align=right data-sort-value="0.73" | 730 m || 
|-id=023 bgcolor=#E9E9E9
| 608023 ||  || — || November 2, 2002 || Haleakala || AMOS ||  || align=right | 2.1 km || 
|-id=024 bgcolor=#fefefe
| 608024 ||  || — || November 6, 2002 || Needville || Needville Obs. ||  || align=right | 1.0 km || 
|-id=025 bgcolor=#E9E9E9
| 608025 ||  || — || November 1, 2002 || La Palma || La Palma Obs. ||  || align=right | 2.3 km || 
|-id=026 bgcolor=#E9E9E9
| 608026 ||  || — || November 1, 2002 || Palomar || NEAT ||  || align=right | 3.2 km || 
|-id=027 bgcolor=#fefefe
| 608027 ||  || — || November 5, 2002 || Socorro || LINEAR ||  || align=right | 1.0 km || 
|-id=028 bgcolor=#E9E9E9
| 608028 ||  || — || November 4, 2002 || Kitt Peak || Spacewatch ||  || align=right | 1.7 km || 
|-id=029 bgcolor=#E9E9E9
| 608029 ||  || — || November 14, 2002 || Socorro || LINEAR ||  || align=right | 2.7 km || 
|-id=030 bgcolor=#E9E9E9
| 608030 ||  || — || September 4, 2011 || Haleakala || Pan-STARRS ||  || align=right | 1.4 km || 
|-id=031 bgcolor=#fefefe
| 608031 ||  || — || October 31, 2002 || Palomar || NEAT ||  || align=right data-sort-value="0.75" | 750 m || 
|-id=032 bgcolor=#E9E9E9
| 608032 ||  || — || December 30, 2007 || Kitt Peak || Spacewatch ||  || align=right | 1.6 km || 
|-id=033 bgcolor=#fefefe
| 608033 ||  || — || October 31, 2002 || Palomar || NEAT ||  || align=right data-sort-value="0.63" | 630 m || 
|-id=034 bgcolor=#E9E9E9
| 608034 ||  || — || June 18, 2006 || Siding Spring || SSS ||  || align=right | 3.1 km || 
|-id=035 bgcolor=#E9E9E9
| 608035 ||  || — || November 6, 2002 || Anderson Mesa || LONEOS ||  || align=right | 2.7 km || 
|-id=036 bgcolor=#fefefe
| 608036 ||  || — || October 2, 2013 || Catalina || CSS ||  || align=right | 1.0 km || 
|-id=037 bgcolor=#E9E9E9
| 608037 ||  || — || March 23, 2014 || Kitt Peak || Spacewatch ||  || align=right | 1.9 km || 
|-id=038 bgcolor=#E9E9E9
| 608038 ||  || — || November 3, 2007 || Kitt Peak || Spacewatch ||  || align=right | 1.6 km || 
|-id=039 bgcolor=#fefefe
| 608039 ||  || — || January 23, 2011 || Mount Lemmon || Mount Lemmon Survey ||  || align=right data-sort-value="0.67" | 670 m || 
|-id=040 bgcolor=#E9E9E9
| 608040 ||  || — || October 25, 2016 || Haleakala || Pan-STARRS ||  || align=right | 1.5 km || 
|-id=041 bgcolor=#fefefe
| 608041 ||  || — || October 3, 2013 || Haleakala || Pan-STARRS ||  || align=right data-sort-value="0.71" | 710 m || 
|-id=042 bgcolor=#E9E9E9
| 608042 ||  || — || April 29, 2014 || Haleakala || Pan-STARRS ||  || align=right | 1.7 km || 
|-id=043 bgcolor=#E9E9E9
| 608043 ||  || — || February 28, 2009 || Mount Lemmon || Mount Lemmon Survey ||  || align=right | 1.7 km || 
|-id=044 bgcolor=#fefefe
| 608044 ||  || — || September 22, 2009 || Kitt Peak || Spacewatch ||  || align=right data-sort-value="0.53" | 530 m || 
|-id=045 bgcolor=#fefefe
| 608045 ||  || — || October 2, 2013 || Haleakala || Pan-STARRS ||  || align=right data-sort-value="0.67" | 670 m || 
|-id=046 bgcolor=#fefefe
| 608046 ||  || — || November 16, 2002 || Palomar || NEAT ||  || align=right data-sort-value="0.73" | 730 m || 
|-id=047 bgcolor=#E9E9E9
| 608047 ||  || — || November 27, 2002 || Haleakala || AMOS ||  || align=right | 1.9 km || 
|-id=048 bgcolor=#E9E9E9
| 608048 ||  || — || October 26, 2002 || Haleakala || AMOS ||  || align=right | 2.7 km || 
|-id=049 bgcolor=#fefefe
| 608049 ||  || — || June 20, 2004 || Kitt Peak || Spacewatch || H || align=right data-sort-value="0.69" | 690 m || 
|-id=050 bgcolor=#fefefe
| 608050 ||  || — || December 13, 2006 || Mount Lemmon || Mount Lemmon Survey ||  || align=right data-sort-value="0.72" | 720 m || 
|-id=051 bgcolor=#E9E9E9
| 608051 ||  || — || January 13, 2008 || Mount Lemmon || Mount Lemmon Survey || DOR || align=right | 2.1 km || 
|-id=052 bgcolor=#fefefe
| 608052 ||  || — || February 13, 2011 || Mount Lemmon || Mount Lemmon Survey ||  || align=right data-sort-value="0.75" | 750 m || 
|-id=053 bgcolor=#fefefe
| 608053 ||  || — || September 28, 2009 || Mount Lemmon || Mount Lemmon Survey ||  || align=right data-sort-value="0.68" | 680 m || 
|-id=054 bgcolor=#E9E9E9
| 608054 ||  || — || November 12, 2002 || Socorro || LINEAR ||  || align=right | 2.3 km || 
|-id=055 bgcolor=#E9E9E9
| 608055 ||  || — || December 6, 2002 || Socorro || LINEAR ||  || align=right | 2.4 km || 
|-id=056 bgcolor=#fefefe
| 608056 ||  || — || January 27, 2007 || Kitt Peak || Spacewatch ||  || align=right data-sort-value="0.65" | 650 m || 
|-id=057 bgcolor=#fefefe
| 608057 ||  || — || November 23, 2006 || Mount Lemmon || Mount Lemmon Survey ||  || align=right data-sort-value="0.75" | 750 m || 
|-id=058 bgcolor=#fefefe
| 608058 ||  || — || October 1, 2005 || Kitt Peak || Spacewatch ||  || align=right data-sort-value="0.46" | 460 m || 
|-id=059 bgcolor=#fefefe
| 608059 ||  || — || April 4, 2008 || Kitt Peak || Spacewatch ||  || align=right data-sort-value="0.72" | 720 m || 
|-id=060 bgcolor=#d6d6d6
| 608060 ||  || — || April 7, 2014 || Kitt Peak || Spacewatch ||  || align=right | 1.6 km || 
|-id=061 bgcolor=#fefefe
| 608061 ||  || — || December 31, 2002 || Socorro || LINEAR ||  || align=right | 1.0 km || 
|-id=062 bgcolor=#fefefe
| 608062 ||  || — || January 10, 2003 || Kitt Peak || Spacewatch ||  || align=right data-sort-value="0.93" | 930 m || 
|-id=063 bgcolor=#d6d6d6
| 608063 ||  || — || November 19, 2008 || Kitt Peak || Spacewatch ||  || align=right | 3.9 km || 
|-id=064 bgcolor=#fefefe
| 608064 ||  || — || February 6, 2007 || Kitt Peak || Spacewatch ||  || align=right data-sort-value="0.60" | 600 m || 
|-id=065 bgcolor=#d6d6d6
| 608065 ||  || — || January 24, 2003 || La Silla || A. Boattini, O. R. Hainaut ||  || align=right | 1.8 km || 
|-id=066 bgcolor=#d6d6d6
| 608066 ||  || — || January 27, 2003 || Kitt Peak || Spacewatch ||  || align=right | 2.7 km || 
|-id=067 bgcolor=#fefefe
| 608067 ||  || — || January 27, 2003 || Socorro || LINEAR ||  || align=right data-sort-value="0.85" | 850 m || 
|-id=068 bgcolor=#E9E9E9
| 608068 ||  || — || January 24, 2003 || Palomar || NEAT ||  || align=right | 2.4 km || 
|-id=069 bgcolor=#fefefe
| 608069 ||  || — || January 29, 2003 || Palomar || NEAT || H || align=right data-sort-value="0.88" | 880 m || 
|-id=070 bgcolor=#E9E9E9
| 608070 ||  || — || January 29, 2003 || Palomar || NEAT ||  || align=right | 2.4 km || 
|-id=071 bgcolor=#fefefe
| 608071 ||  || — || October 14, 2009 || Mount Lemmon || Mount Lemmon Survey ||  || align=right | 1.0 km || 
|-id=072 bgcolor=#fefefe
| 608072 ||  || — || January 4, 2016 || Haleakala || Pan-STARRS ||  || align=right data-sort-value="0.57" | 570 m || 
|-id=073 bgcolor=#fefefe
| 608073 ||  || — || September 19, 2014 || Haleakala || Pan-STARRS ||  || align=right data-sort-value="0.83" | 830 m || 
|-id=074 bgcolor=#E9E9E9
| 608074 ||  || — || September 4, 2010 || Mount Lemmon || Mount Lemmon Survey ||  || align=right | 1.7 km || 
|-id=075 bgcolor=#fefefe
| 608075 ||  || — || January 8, 2016 || Haleakala || Pan-STARRS ||  || align=right data-sort-value="0.57" | 570 m || 
|-id=076 bgcolor=#E9E9E9
| 608076 ||  || — || November 17, 2011 || Mount Lemmon || Mount Lemmon Survey ||  || align=right | 1.9 km || 
|-id=077 bgcolor=#fefefe
| 608077 ||  || — || April 15, 2015 || iTelescope || B. C. Dawson ||  || align=right data-sort-value="0.92" | 920 m || 
|-id=078 bgcolor=#fefefe
| 608078 ||  || — || February 23, 2003 || Campo Imperatore || CINEOS ||  || align=right data-sort-value="0.67" | 670 m || 
|-id=079 bgcolor=#d6d6d6
| 608079 ||  || — || February 9, 2008 || Kitt Peak || Spacewatch ||  || align=right | 2.0 km || 
|-id=080 bgcolor=#fefefe
| 608080 ||  || — || March 20, 2007 || Kitt Peak || Spacewatch ||  || align=right | 1.0 km || 
|-id=081 bgcolor=#d6d6d6
| 608081 ||  || — || March 11, 2003 || Kitt Peak || Spacewatch ||  || align=right | 1.9 km || 
|-id=082 bgcolor=#d6d6d6
| 608082 ||  || — || September 4, 2010 || Mount Lemmon || Mount Lemmon Survey ||  || align=right | 1.9 km || 
|-id=083 bgcolor=#fefefe
| 608083 ||  || — || March 31, 2003 || Kitt Peak || Spacewatch ||  || align=right data-sort-value="0.76" | 760 m || 
|-id=084 bgcolor=#fefefe
| 608084 ||  || — || March 30, 2003 || Kitt Peak || M. W. Buie, A. B. Jordan ||  || align=right data-sort-value="0.64" | 640 m || 
|-id=085 bgcolor=#fefefe
| 608085 ||  || — || September 23, 2004 || Kitt Peak || Spacewatch ||  || align=right data-sort-value="0.65" | 650 m || 
|-id=086 bgcolor=#d6d6d6
| 608086 ||  || — || June 5, 2014 || Haleakala || Pan-STARRS ||  || align=right | 2.2 km || 
|-id=087 bgcolor=#fefefe
| 608087 ||  || — || March 31, 2003 || Kitt Peak || Spacewatch ||  || align=right data-sort-value="0.57" | 570 m || 
|-id=088 bgcolor=#d6d6d6
| 608088 ||  || — || May 21, 2014 || Haleakala || Pan-STARRS ||  || align=right | 2.2 km || 
|-id=089 bgcolor=#fefefe
| 608089 ||  || — || March 24, 2003 || Kitt Peak || Spacewatch ||  || align=right data-sort-value="0.78" | 780 m || 
|-id=090 bgcolor=#d6d6d6
| 608090 ||  || — || March 2, 2008 || Mount Lemmon || Mount Lemmon Survey ||  || align=right | 3.3 km || 
|-id=091 bgcolor=#d6d6d6
| 608091 ||  || — || March 19, 2013 || Haleakala || Pan-STARRS ||  || align=right | 2.0 km || 
|-id=092 bgcolor=#d6d6d6
| 608092 ||  || — || March 4, 2008 || Kitt Peak || Spacewatch ||  || align=right | 2.2 km || 
|-id=093 bgcolor=#E9E9E9
| 608093 ||  || — || April 5, 2003 || Kitt Peak || Spacewatch ||  || align=right data-sort-value="0.64" | 640 m || 
|-id=094 bgcolor=#C2FFFF
| 608094 ||  || — || February 16, 2015 || Haleakala || Pan-STARRS || L4 || align=right | 6.9 km || 
|-id=095 bgcolor=#fefefe
| 608095 ||  || — || February 11, 2011 || Mount Lemmon || Mount Lemmon Survey ||  || align=right data-sort-value="0.81" | 810 m || 
|-id=096 bgcolor=#E9E9E9
| 608096 ||  || — || April 11, 2003 || Kitt Peak || Spacewatch ||  || align=right | 1.2 km || 
|-id=097 bgcolor=#d6d6d6
| 608097 ||  || — || March 31, 2008 || Mount Lemmon || Mount Lemmon Survey ||  || align=right | 2.7 km || 
|-id=098 bgcolor=#fefefe
| 608098 ||  || — || June 20, 2010 || Mount Lemmon || Mount Lemmon Survey ||  || align=right data-sort-value="0.56" | 560 m || 
|-id=099 bgcolor=#fefefe
| 608099 ||  || — || March 19, 2013 || Haleakala || Pan-STARRS ||  || align=right data-sort-value="0.49" | 490 m || 
|-id=100 bgcolor=#E9E9E9
| 608100 ||  || — || February 17, 2015 || Haleakala || Pan-STARRS ||  || align=right data-sort-value="0.72" | 720 m || 
|}

608101–608200 

|-bgcolor=#d6d6d6
| 608101 ||  || — || April 10, 2003 || Kitt Peak || Spacewatch ||  || align=right | 2.4 km || 
|-id=102 bgcolor=#d6d6d6
| 608102 ||  || — || September 29, 2010 || Mount Lemmon || Mount Lemmon Survey ||  || align=right | 2.0 km || 
|-id=103 bgcolor=#fefefe
| 608103 ||  || — || February 10, 2016 || Haleakala || Pan-STARRS ||  || align=right data-sort-value="0.58" | 580 m || 
|-id=104 bgcolor=#C2FFFF
| 608104 ||  || — || January 26, 2012 || Haleakala || Pan-STARRS || L4 || align=right | 6.5 km || 
|-id=105 bgcolor=#d6d6d6
| 608105 ||  || — || February 14, 2013 || Haleakala || Pan-STARRS ||  || align=right | 2.2 km || 
|-id=106 bgcolor=#d6d6d6
| 608106 ||  || — || March 3, 2008 || Mount Lemmon || Mount Lemmon Survey ||  || align=right | 2.2 km || 
|-id=107 bgcolor=#d6d6d6
| 608107 ||  || — || October 1, 2015 || Mount Lemmon || Mount Lemmon Survey ||  || align=right | 2.2 km || 
|-id=108 bgcolor=#C2FFFF
| 608108 ||  || — || October 9, 2008 || Mount Lemmon || Mount Lemmon Survey || L4 || align=right | 6.4 km || 
|-id=109 bgcolor=#E9E9E9
| 608109 ||  || — || April 1, 2003 || Kitt Peak || M. W. Buie, A. B. Jordan ||  || align=right data-sort-value="0.63" | 630 m || 
|-id=110 bgcolor=#fefefe
| 608110 ||  || — || April 25, 2003 || Kitt Peak || Spacewatch ||  || align=right data-sort-value="0.46" | 460 m || 
|-id=111 bgcolor=#fefefe
| 608111 ||  || — || April 25, 2003 || Kitt Peak || Spacewatch ||  || align=right data-sort-value="0.55" | 550 m || 
|-id=112 bgcolor=#fefefe
| 608112 ||  || — || January 29, 2012 || Mount Lemmon || Mount Lemmon Survey ||  || align=right data-sort-value="0.89" | 890 m || 
|-id=113 bgcolor=#fefefe
| 608113 ||  || — || April 15, 2013 || Haleakala || Pan-STARRS ||  || align=right data-sort-value="0.61" | 610 m || 
|-id=114 bgcolor=#C2FFFF
| 608114 ||  || — || June 22, 2004 || Kitt Peak || Spacewatch || L4 || align=right | 8.3 km || 
|-id=115 bgcolor=#fefefe
| 608115 ||  || — || April 24, 2003 || Kitt Peak || Spacewatch ||  || align=right data-sort-value="0.53" | 530 m || 
|-id=116 bgcolor=#d6d6d6
| 608116 ||  || — || March 31, 2008 || Kitt Peak || Spacewatch ||  || align=right | 1.8 km || 
|-id=117 bgcolor=#E9E9E9
| 608117 ||  || — || January 23, 2015 || Haleakala || Pan-STARRS ||  || align=right | 1.1 km || 
|-id=118 bgcolor=#d6d6d6
| 608118 ||  || — || April 11, 2008 || Kitt Peak || Spacewatch ||  || align=right | 2.5 km || 
|-id=119 bgcolor=#fefefe
| 608119 ||  || — || April 30, 2003 || Kitt Peak || Spacewatch ||  || align=right data-sort-value="0.57" | 570 m || 
|-id=120 bgcolor=#fefefe
| 608120 ||  || — || October 13, 2015 || Haleakala || Pan-STARRS || H || align=right data-sort-value="0.58" | 580 m || 
|-id=121 bgcolor=#E9E9E9
| 608121 ||  || — || April 16, 2007 || Catalina || CSS ||  || align=right | 1.1 km || 
|-id=122 bgcolor=#d6d6d6
| 608122 ||  || — || April 30, 2003 || Kitt Peak || Spacewatch ||  || align=right | 2.3 km || 
|-id=123 bgcolor=#d6d6d6
| 608123 ||  || — || October 8, 2004 || Anderson Mesa || LONEOS ||  || align=right | 2.7 km || 
|-id=124 bgcolor=#d6d6d6
| 608124 ||  || — || February 28, 2008 || Kitt Peak || Spacewatch ||  || align=right | 2.1 km || 
|-id=125 bgcolor=#fefefe
| 608125 ||  || — || February 11, 2016 || Haleakala || Pan-STARRS ||  || align=right data-sort-value="0.60" | 600 m || 
|-id=126 bgcolor=#d6d6d6
| 608126 ||  || — || March 13, 2008 || Kitt Peak || Spacewatch ||  || align=right | 1.9 km || 
|-id=127 bgcolor=#E9E9E9
| 608127 ||  || — || July 7, 2016 || Haleakala || Pan-STARRS ||  || align=right data-sort-value="0.87" | 870 m || 
|-id=128 bgcolor=#fefefe
| 608128 ||  || — || April 29, 2003 || Kitt Peak || Spacewatch ||  || align=right data-sort-value="0.68" | 680 m || 
|-id=129 bgcolor=#fefefe
| 608129 ||  || — || April 25, 2003 || Kitt Peak || Spacewatch ||  || align=right data-sort-value="0.75" | 750 m || 
|-id=130 bgcolor=#d6d6d6
| 608130 ||  || — || May 1, 2003 || Kitt Peak || Spacewatch ||  || align=right | 2.1 km || 
|-id=131 bgcolor=#fefefe
| 608131 ||  || — || November 1, 2011 || Mount Lemmon || Mount Lemmon Survey ||  || align=right data-sort-value="0.60" | 600 m || 
|-id=132 bgcolor=#d6d6d6
| 608132 ||  || — || May 1, 2003 || Kitt Peak || Spacewatch ||  || align=right | 2.4 km || 
|-id=133 bgcolor=#fefefe
| 608133 ||  || — || November 30, 2005 || Kitt Peak || Spacewatch ||  || align=right data-sort-value="0.79" | 790 m || 
|-id=134 bgcolor=#d6d6d6
| 608134 ||  || — || May 23, 2003 || Kitt Peak || Spacewatch || Tj (2.96) || align=right | 2.1 km || 
|-id=135 bgcolor=#E9E9E9
| 608135 ||  || — || May 26, 2003 || Kitt Peak || Spacewatch ||  || align=right data-sort-value="0.72" | 720 m || 
|-id=136 bgcolor=#fefefe
| 608136 ||  || — || January 9, 2014 || Haleakala || Pan-STARRS ||  || align=right data-sort-value="0.81" | 810 m || 
|-id=137 bgcolor=#d6d6d6
| 608137 ||  || — || May 26, 2014 || Haleakala || Pan-STARRS ||  || align=right | 2.3 km || 
|-id=138 bgcolor=#E9E9E9
| 608138 ||  || — || February 16, 2015 || Haleakala || Pan-STARRS ||  || align=right data-sort-value="0.85" | 850 m || 
|-id=139 bgcolor=#E9E9E9
| 608139 ||  || — || June 2, 2003 || Cerro Tololo || M. W. Buie, K. J. Meech ||  || align=right | 1.3 km || 
|-id=140 bgcolor=#d6d6d6
| 608140 ||  || — || April 13, 2008 || Mount Lemmon || Mount Lemmon Survey ||  || align=right | 2.2 km || 
|-id=141 bgcolor=#fefefe
| 608141 ||  || — || November 29, 2005 || Kitt Peak || Spacewatch ||  || align=right data-sort-value="0.89" | 890 m || 
|-id=142 bgcolor=#d6d6d6
| 608142 ||  || — || October 14, 2009 || Bergisch Gladbach || W. Bickel ||  || align=right | 2.9 km || 
|-id=143 bgcolor=#d6d6d6
| 608143 ||  || — || January 23, 2018 || Mount Lemmon || Mount Lemmon Survey ||  || align=right | 2.0 km || 
|-id=144 bgcolor=#d6d6d6
| 608144 ||  || — || April 15, 2008 || Mount Lemmon || Mount Lemmon Survey ||  || align=right | 2.3 km || 
|-id=145 bgcolor=#d6d6d6
| 608145 ||  || — || October 8, 2015 || Mount Lemmon || Mount Lemmon Survey ||  || align=right | 1.9 km || 
|-id=146 bgcolor=#FA8072
| 608146 ||  || — || May 28, 2003 || Kitt Peak || Spacewatch ||  || align=right | 1.6 km || 
|-id=147 bgcolor=#E9E9E9
| 608147 ||  || — || June 27, 2003 || Nogales || P. R. Holvorcem, M. Schwartz || ADE || align=right | 1.9 km || 
|-id=148 bgcolor=#E9E9E9
| 608148 ||  || — || June 22, 2003 || Mauna Kea || T. Burdullis, P. Martin ||  || align=right data-sort-value="0.97" | 970 m || 
|-id=149 bgcolor=#fefefe
| 608149 ||  || — || August 13, 2010 || Kitt Peak || Spacewatch ||  || align=right data-sort-value="0.54" | 540 m || 
|-id=150 bgcolor=#d6d6d6
| 608150 ||  || — || July 9, 2003 || Mount Graham || W. H. Ryan, C. T. Martinez || TIR || align=right | 2.8 km || 
|-id=151 bgcolor=#fefefe
| 608151 ||  || — || July 8, 2003 || Palomar || NEAT ||  || align=right data-sort-value="0.63" | 630 m || 
|-id=152 bgcolor=#E9E9E9
| 608152 ||  || — || November 20, 2008 || Kitt Peak || Spacewatch ||  || align=right data-sort-value="0.87" | 870 m || 
|-id=153 bgcolor=#d6d6d6
| 608153 ||  || — || July 8, 2003 || Palomar || NEAT ||  || align=right | 2.5 km || 
|-id=154 bgcolor=#d6d6d6
| 608154 ||  || — || March 5, 2013 || Haleakala || Pan-STARRS ||  || align=right | 1.9 km || 
|-id=155 bgcolor=#E9E9E9
| 608155 ||  || — || July 22, 2003 || Haleakala || AMOS ||  || align=right | 2.0 km || 
|-id=156 bgcolor=#E9E9E9
| 608156 ||  || — || July 26, 2003 || Socorro || LINEAR ||  || align=right | 1.2 km || 
|-id=157 bgcolor=#E9E9E9
| 608157 ||  || — || July 23, 2003 || Palomar || NEAT ||  || align=right | 1.4 km || 
|-id=158 bgcolor=#E9E9E9
| 608158 ||  || — || July 28, 2003 || Cerro Tololo || I. P. Griffin, A. Miranda ||  || align=right data-sort-value="0.89" | 890 m || 
|-id=159 bgcolor=#E9E9E9
| 608159 ||  || — || July 8, 2003 || Palomar || NEAT ||  || align=right | 1.2 km || 
|-id=160 bgcolor=#d6d6d6
| 608160 ||  || — || July 22, 2003 || Campo Imperatore || CINEOS ||  || align=right | 3.6 km || 
|-id=161 bgcolor=#E9E9E9
| 608161 ||  || — || July 25, 2003 || Palomar || NEAT ||  || align=right | 1.4 km || 
|-id=162 bgcolor=#d6d6d6
| 608162 ||  || — || July 22, 2003 || Haleakala || AMOS ||  || align=right | 3.8 km || 
|-id=163 bgcolor=#d6d6d6
| 608163 ||  || — || November 11, 2010 || Mount Lemmon || Mount Lemmon Survey ||  || align=right | 3.7 km || 
|-id=164 bgcolor=#E9E9E9
| 608164 ||  || — || July 23, 2003 || Palomar || NEAT ||  || align=right | 1.2 km || 
|-id=165 bgcolor=#fefefe
| 608165 ||  || — || November 1, 2007 || Kitt Peak || Spacewatch ||  || align=right data-sort-value="0.74" | 740 m || 
|-id=166 bgcolor=#E9E9E9
| 608166 ||  || — || August 5, 2003 || Kitt Peak || Spacewatch ||  || align=right | 1.6 km || 
|-id=167 bgcolor=#fefefe
| 608167 ||  || — || August 4, 2003 || Kitt Peak || Spacewatch ||  || align=right data-sort-value="0.53" | 530 m || 
|-id=168 bgcolor=#d6d6d6
| 608168 ||  || — || August 4, 2003 || Kitt Peak || Spacewatch ||  || align=right | 2.6 km || 
|-id=169 bgcolor=#E9E9E9
| 608169 ||  || — || July 25, 2003 || Palomar || NEAT ||  || align=right | 1.3 km || 
|-id=170 bgcolor=#d6d6d6
| 608170 ||  || — || August 19, 2003 || Campo Imperatore || CINEOS ||  || align=right | 2.3 km || 
|-id=171 bgcolor=#d6d6d6
| 608171 ||  || — || August 22, 2003 || Palomar || NEAT ||  || align=right | 2.9 km || 
|-id=172 bgcolor=#E9E9E9
| 608172 ||  || — || August 22, 2003 || Palomar || NEAT ||  || align=right | 1.5 km || 
|-id=173 bgcolor=#d6d6d6
| 608173 ||  || — || July 26, 2003 || Campo Imperatore || CINEOS ||  || align=right | 3.5 km || 
|-id=174 bgcolor=#E9E9E9
| 608174 ||  || — || July 23, 2003 || Palomar || NEAT || JUN || align=right | 1.0 km || 
|-id=175 bgcolor=#E9E9E9
| 608175 ||  || — || August 24, 2003 || Cerro Tololo || Cerro Tololo Obs. ||  || align=right | 1.5 km || 
|-id=176 bgcolor=#E9E9E9
| 608176 ||  || — || August 26, 2003 || Cerro Tololo || Cerro Tololo Obs. ||  || align=right data-sort-value="0.98" | 980 m || 
|-id=177 bgcolor=#E9E9E9
| 608177 ||  || — || August 31, 2003 || Crni Vrh || H. Mikuž ||  || align=right | 1.4 km || 
|-id=178 bgcolor=#E9E9E9
| 608178 ||  || — || August 26, 2003 || Cerro Tololo || Cerro Tololo Obs. ||  || align=right | 1.0 km || 
|-id=179 bgcolor=#E9E9E9
| 608179 ||  || — || August 23, 2003 || Palomar || NEAT ||  || align=right | 1.9 km || 
|-id=180 bgcolor=#fefefe
| 608180 ||  || — || August 28, 2003 || Palomar || NEAT ||  || align=right data-sort-value="0.67" | 670 m || 
|-id=181 bgcolor=#fefefe
| 608181 ||  || — || August 28, 2003 || Palomar || NEAT ||  || align=right data-sort-value="0.55" | 550 m || 
|-id=182 bgcolor=#E9E9E9
| 608182 ||  || — || October 4, 2016 || XuYi || PMO NEO ||  || align=right | 1.9 km || 
|-id=183 bgcolor=#E9E9E9
| 608183 ||  || — || March 17, 2005 || Mount Lemmon || Mount Lemmon Survey ||  || align=right | 1.2 km || 
|-id=184 bgcolor=#fefefe
| 608184 ||  || — || December 15, 2014 || Mount Lemmon || Mount Lemmon Survey ||  || align=right data-sort-value="0.57" | 570 m || 
|-id=185 bgcolor=#fefefe
| 608185 ||  || — || August 26, 2003 || Cerro Tololo || Cerro Tololo Obs. ||  || align=right data-sort-value="0.63" | 630 m || 
|-id=186 bgcolor=#E9E9E9
| 608186 ||  || — || October 18, 2012 || Haleakala || Pan-STARRS ||  || align=right data-sort-value="0.72" | 720 m || 
|-id=187 bgcolor=#fefefe
| 608187 ||  || — || November 5, 2007 || Mount Lemmon || Mount Lemmon Survey ||  || align=right data-sort-value="0.69" | 690 m || 
|-id=188 bgcolor=#d6d6d6
| 608188 ||  || — || December 13, 2010 || Mount Lemmon || Mount Lemmon Survey ||  || align=right | 2.7 km || 
|-id=189 bgcolor=#E9E9E9
| 608189 ||  || — || March 16, 2010 || Mount Lemmon || Mount Lemmon Survey ||  || align=right | 1.0 km || 
|-id=190 bgcolor=#d6d6d6
| 608190 ||  || — || August 26, 2003 || Cerro Tololo || Cerro Tololo Obs. ||  || align=right | 2.3 km || 
|-id=191 bgcolor=#E9E9E9
| 608191 ||  || — || August 22, 2003 || Palomar || NEAT ||  || align=right | 1.7 km || 
|-id=192 bgcolor=#d6d6d6
| 608192 ||  || — || September 15, 2003 || Palomar || NEAT ||  || align=right | 2.5 km || 
|-id=193 bgcolor=#E9E9E9
| 608193 ||  || — || September 6, 2003 || Campo Imperatore || A. Boattini, A. Di Paola ||  || align=right | 1.4 km || 
|-id=194 bgcolor=#E9E9E9
| 608194 ||  || — || September 16, 2012 || Kitt Peak || Spacewatch ||  || align=right | 1.1 km || 
|-id=195 bgcolor=#d6d6d6
| 608195 ||  || — || September 16, 2003 || Kitt Peak || Spacewatch ||  || align=right | 2.4 km || 
|-id=196 bgcolor=#E9E9E9
| 608196 ||  || — || September 16, 2003 || Kitt Peak || Spacewatch ||  || align=right | 1.5 km || 
|-id=197 bgcolor=#d6d6d6
| 608197 ||  || — || September 17, 2003 || Kitt Peak || Spacewatch || Tj (2.99) || align=right | 2.3 km || 
|-id=198 bgcolor=#d6d6d6
| 608198 ||  || — || September 17, 2003 || Kitt Peak || Spacewatch ||  || align=right | 2.7 km || 
|-id=199 bgcolor=#E9E9E9
| 608199 ||  || — || September 16, 2003 || Kitt Peak || Spacewatch ||  || align=right | 1.2 km || 
|-id=200 bgcolor=#d6d6d6
| 608200 ||  || — || September 16, 2003 || Kitt Peak || Spacewatch ||  || align=right | 2.4 km || 
|}

608201–608300 

|-bgcolor=#d6d6d6
| 608201 ||  || — || September 16, 2003 || Kitt Peak || Spacewatch ||  || align=right | 3.1 km || 
|-id=202 bgcolor=#E9E9E9
| 608202 ||  || — || September 18, 2003 || Palomar || NEAT ||  || align=right | 1.8 km || 
|-id=203 bgcolor=#d6d6d6
| 608203 ||  || — || September 16, 2003 || Palomar || NEAT ||  || align=right | 2.9 km || 
|-id=204 bgcolor=#d6d6d6
| 608204 ||  || — || September 19, 2003 || Kitt Peak || Spacewatch ||  || align=right | 2.5 km || 
|-id=205 bgcolor=#fefefe
| 608205 ||  || — || September 18, 2003 || Kitt Peak || Spacewatch ||  || align=right data-sort-value="0.61" | 610 m || 
|-id=206 bgcolor=#E9E9E9
| 608206 ||  || — || September 19, 2003 || Palomar || NEAT ||  || align=right | 1.8 km || 
|-id=207 bgcolor=#d6d6d6
| 608207 ||  || — || September 19, 2003 || Kitt Peak || Spacewatch ||  || align=right | 2.5 km || 
|-id=208 bgcolor=#E9E9E9
| 608208 ||  || — || September 20, 2003 || Kitt Peak || Spacewatch ||  || align=right | 1.8 km || 
|-id=209 bgcolor=#d6d6d6
| 608209 ||  || — || September 20, 2003 || Kitt Peak || Spacewatch ||  || align=right | 3.2 km || 
|-id=210 bgcolor=#d6d6d6
| 608210 ||  || — || September 20, 2003 || Kitt Peak || Spacewatch ||  || align=right | 2.6 km || 
|-id=211 bgcolor=#d6d6d6
| 608211 ||  || — || September 16, 2003 || Kitt Peak || Spacewatch ||  || align=right | 2.7 km || 
|-id=212 bgcolor=#d6d6d6
| 608212 ||  || — || September 16, 2003 || Kitt Peak || Spacewatch ||  || align=right | 2.2 km || 
|-id=213 bgcolor=#E9E9E9
| 608213 ||  || — || September 17, 2003 || Palomar || NEAT ||  || align=right | 1.0 km || 
|-id=214 bgcolor=#d6d6d6
| 608214 ||  || — || September 17, 2003 || Kitt Peak || Spacewatch ||  || align=right | 2.5 km || 
|-id=215 bgcolor=#E9E9E9
| 608215 ||  || — || September 17, 2003 || Palomar || NEAT ||  || align=right | 1.3 km || 
|-id=216 bgcolor=#E9E9E9
| 608216 ||  || — || September 19, 2003 || Kitt Peak || Spacewatch ||  || align=right | 1.3 km || 
|-id=217 bgcolor=#E9E9E9
| 608217 ||  || — || September 19, 2003 || Palomar || NEAT ||  || align=right | 1.7 km || 
|-id=218 bgcolor=#E9E9E9
| 608218 ||  || — || September 20, 2003 || Socorro || LINEAR ||  || align=right | 1.2 km || 
|-id=219 bgcolor=#E9E9E9
| 608219 ||  || — || September 21, 2003 || Kitt Peak || Spacewatch ||  || align=right | 1.3 km || 
|-id=220 bgcolor=#E9E9E9
| 608220 ||  || — || September 20, 2003 || Palomar || NEAT ||  || align=right | 1.4 km || 
|-id=221 bgcolor=#E9E9E9
| 608221 ||  || — || September 20, 2003 || Palomar || NEAT ||  || align=right | 2.1 km || 
|-id=222 bgcolor=#E9E9E9
| 608222 ||  || — || September 26, 2003 || Socorro || LINEAR ||  || align=right | 1.4 km || 
|-id=223 bgcolor=#E9E9E9
| 608223 ||  || — || August 28, 2003 || Palomar || NEAT ||  || align=right | 2.0 km || 
|-id=224 bgcolor=#E9E9E9
| 608224 ||  || — || September 27, 2003 || Kitt Peak || Spacewatch ||  || align=right | 1.1 km || 
|-id=225 bgcolor=#d6d6d6
| 608225 ||  || — || September 18, 2003 || Kitt Peak || Spacewatch ||  || align=right | 2.4 km || 
|-id=226 bgcolor=#fefefe
| 608226 ||  || — || September 27, 2003 || Kitt Peak || Spacewatch ||  || align=right data-sort-value="0.63" | 630 m || 
|-id=227 bgcolor=#fefefe
| 608227 ||  || — || September 4, 2003 || Kitt Peak || Spacewatch ||  || align=right data-sort-value="0.53" | 530 m || 
|-id=228 bgcolor=#fefefe
| 608228 ||  || — || September 21, 2003 || Kitt Peak || Spacewatch ||  || align=right data-sort-value="0.52" | 520 m || 
|-id=229 bgcolor=#d6d6d6
| 608229 ||  || — || September 29, 2003 || Kitt Peak || Spacewatch ||  || align=right | 3.2 km || 
|-id=230 bgcolor=#d6d6d6
| 608230 ||  || — || September 30, 2003 || Kitt Peak || Spacewatch ||  || align=right | 3.2 km || 
|-id=231 bgcolor=#E9E9E9
| 608231 ||  || — || December 16, 1999 || Kitt Peak || Spacewatch ||  || align=right | 1.9 km || 
|-id=232 bgcolor=#E9E9E9
| 608232 ||  || — || September 26, 2003 || Goodricke-Pigott || R. A. Tucker ||  || align=right | 1.6 km || 
|-id=233 bgcolor=#E9E9E9
| 608233 ||  || — || September 28, 2003 || Kitt Peak || Spacewatch ||  || align=right data-sort-value="0.92" | 920 m || 
|-id=234 bgcolor=#E9E9E9
| 608234 ||  || — || September 20, 2003 || Palomar || NEAT ||  || align=right | 1.3 km || 
|-id=235 bgcolor=#E9E9E9
| 608235 ||  || — || September 29, 2003 || Kitt Peak || Spacewatch ||  || align=right | 1.1 km || 
|-id=236 bgcolor=#E9E9E9
| 608236 ||  || — || September 19, 2003 || Kitt Peak || Spacewatch ||  || align=right | 1.5 km || 
|-id=237 bgcolor=#d6d6d6
| 608237 ||  || — || September 28, 2003 || Kitt Peak || Spacewatch ||  || align=right | 2.2 km || 
|-id=238 bgcolor=#E9E9E9
| 608238 ||  || — || September 17, 2003 || Kitt Peak || Spacewatch ||  || align=right | 1.2 km || 
|-id=239 bgcolor=#E9E9E9
| 608239 ||  || — || September 17, 2003 || Kitt Peak || Spacewatch ||  || align=right | 1.2 km || 
|-id=240 bgcolor=#d6d6d6
| 608240 ||  || — || September 18, 2003 || Kitt Peak || Spacewatch ||  || align=right | 2.7 km || 
|-id=241 bgcolor=#fefefe
| 608241 ||  || — || September 22, 2003 || Palomar || NEAT ||  || align=right data-sort-value="0.65" | 650 m || 
|-id=242 bgcolor=#E9E9E9
| 608242 ||  || — || September 18, 2003 || Kitt Peak || Spacewatch ||  || align=right | 1.3 km || 
|-id=243 bgcolor=#E9E9E9
| 608243 ||  || — || September 29, 2003 || Kitt Peak || Spacewatch ||  || align=right | 1.5 km || 
|-id=244 bgcolor=#E9E9E9
| 608244 ||  || — || September 28, 2003 || Apache Point || SDSS Collaboration ||  || align=right | 1.1 km || 
|-id=245 bgcolor=#E9E9E9
| 608245 ||  || — || January 15, 2005 || Kitt Peak || Spacewatch ||  || align=right | 1.3 km || 
|-id=246 bgcolor=#fefefe
| 608246 ||  || — || September 19, 2003 || Palomar || NEAT || (1338) || align=right data-sort-value="0.86" | 860 m || 
|-id=247 bgcolor=#E9E9E9
| 608247 ||  || — || February 2, 2005 || Kitt Peak || Spacewatch ||  || align=right | 1.0 km || 
|-id=248 bgcolor=#fefefe
| 608248 ||  || — || August 28, 2003 || Palomar || NEAT ||  || align=right data-sort-value="0.55" | 550 m || 
|-id=249 bgcolor=#fefefe
| 608249 ||  || — || April 9, 2005 || Mount Lemmon || Mount Lemmon Survey ||  || align=right data-sort-value="0.51" | 510 m || 
|-id=250 bgcolor=#d6d6d6
| 608250 ||  || — || September 18, 2003 || Kitt Peak || Spacewatch ||  || align=right | 2.0 km || 
|-id=251 bgcolor=#E9E9E9
| 608251 ||  || — || September 18, 2003 || Kitt Peak || Spacewatch ||  || align=right | 1.2 km || 
|-id=252 bgcolor=#fefefe
| 608252 ||  || — || September 18, 2003 || Kitt Peak || Spacewatch ||  || align=right data-sort-value="0.47" | 470 m || 
|-id=253 bgcolor=#E9E9E9
| 608253 ||  || — || September 18, 2003 || Kitt Peak || Spacewatch ||  || align=right | 1.2 km || 
|-id=254 bgcolor=#d6d6d6
| 608254 ||  || — || September 18, 2003 || Kitt Peak || Spacewatch ||  || align=right | 2.0 km || 
|-id=255 bgcolor=#fefefe
| 608255 ||  || — || September 23, 2003 || Palomar || NEAT ||  || align=right data-sort-value="0.64" | 640 m || 
|-id=256 bgcolor=#E9E9E9
| 608256 ||  || — || September 25, 2003 || Palomar || NEAT ||  || align=right | 1.3 km || 
|-id=257 bgcolor=#d6d6d6
| 608257 ||  || — || September 26, 2003 || Socorro || LINEAR ||  || align=right | 2.6 km || 
|-id=258 bgcolor=#E9E9E9
| 608258 ||  || — || September 18, 2003 || Kitt Peak || Spacewatch ||  || align=right | 1.2 km || 
|-id=259 bgcolor=#E9E9E9
| 608259 ||  || — || September 21, 2003 || Kitt Peak || Spacewatch ||  || align=right | 1.6 km || 
|-id=260 bgcolor=#d6d6d6
| 608260 ||  || — || September 22, 2003 || Kitt Peak || Spacewatch ||  || align=right | 2.7 km || 
|-id=261 bgcolor=#d6d6d6
| 608261 ||  || — || September 22, 2003 || Kitt Peak || Spacewatch ||  || align=right | 2.4 km || 
|-id=262 bgcolor=#d6d6d6
| 608262 ||  || — || September 26, 2003 || Apache Point || SDSS Collaboration ||  || align=right | 2.3 km || 
|-id=263 bgcolor=#d6d6d6
| 608263 ||  || — || September 26, 2003 || Apache Point || SDSS Collaboration ||  || align=right | 2.6 km || 
|-id=264 bgcolor=#fefefe
| 608264 ||  || — || March 11, 2005 || Mount Lemmon || Mount Lemmon Survey ||  || align=right data-sort-value="0.64" | 640 m || 
|-id=265 bgcolor=#d6d6d6
| 608265 ||  || — || September 26, 2003 || Apache Point || SDSS Collaboration ||  || align=right | 2.1 km || 
|-id=266 bgcolor=#E9E9E9
| 608266 ||  || — || September 16, 2003 || Kitt Peak || Spacewatch ||  || align=right | 1.3 km || 
|-id=267 bgcolor=#d6d6d6
| 608267 ||  || — || September 26, 2003 || Apache Point || SDSS Collaboration ||  || align=right | 2.3 km || 
|-id=268 bgcolor=#E9E9E9
| 608268 ||  || — || September 27, 2003 || Kitt Peak || Spacewatch ||  || align=right | 1.1 km || 
|-id=269 bgcolor=#d6d6d6
| 608269 ||  || — || September 27, 2003 || Kitt Peak || Spacewatch ||  || align=right | 2.5 km || 
|-id=270 bgcolor=#E9E9E9
| 608270 ||  || — || September 17, 2003 || Kitt Peak || Spacewatch ||  || align=right | 1.2 km || 
|-id=271 bgcolor=#E9E9E9
| 608271 ||  || — || September 17, 2003 || Kitt Peak || Spacewatch ||  || align=right | 1.5 km || 
|-id=272 bgcolor=#d6d6d6
| 608272 ||  || — || September 26, 2003 || Apache Point || SDSS Collaboration ||  || align=right | 2.1 km || 
|-id=273 bgcolor=#d6d6d6
| 608273 ||  || — || December 11, 2004 || Kitt Peak || Spacewatch ||  || align=right | 2.5 km || 
|-id=274 bgcolor=#E9E9E9
| 608274 ||  || — || September 28, 2003 || Kitt Peak || Spacewatch ||  || align=right | 1.1 km || 
|-id=275 bgcolor=#d6d6d6
| 608275 ||  || — || September 29, 2003 || Kitt Peak || Spacewatch ||  || align=right | 2.2 km || 
|-id=276 bgcolor=#d6d6d6
| 608276 ||  || — || September 26, 2003 || Apache Point || SDSS Collaboration ||  || align=right | 2.5 km || 
|-id=277 bgcolor=#E9E9E9
| 608277 ||  || — || March 11, 2005 || Mount Lemmon || Mount Lemmon Survey ||  || align=right | 1.3 km || 
|-id=278 bgcolor=#fefefe
| 608278 ||  || — || March 8, 2005 || Mount Lemmon || Mount Lemmon Survey ||  || align=right data-sort-value="0.62" | 620 m || 
|-id=279 bgcolor=#d6d6d6
| 608279 ||  || — || September 26, 2003 || Apache Point || SDSS Collaboration ||  || align=right | 2.4 km || 
|-id=280 bgcolor=#E9E9E9
| 608280 ||  || — || October 2, 2003 || Kitt Peak || Spacewatch ||  || align=right | 1.1 km || 
|-id=281 bgcolor=#fefefe
| 608281 ||  || — || September 26, 2003 || Apache Point || SDSS Collaboration ||  || align=right data-sort-value="0.62" | 620 m || 
|-id=282 bgcolor=#fefefe
| 608282 ||  || — || March 16, 2005 || Catalina || CSS ||  || align=right data-sort-value="0.94" | 940 m || 
|-id=283 bgcolor=#fefefe
| 608283 ||  || — || September 26, 2003 || Apache Point || SDSS Collaboration ||  || align=right data-sort-value="0.72" | 720 m || 
|-id=284 bgcolor=#d6d6d6
| 608284 ||  || — || September 26, 2003 || Apache Point || SDSS Collaboration ||  || align=right | 2.4 km || 
|-id=285 bgcolor=#fefefe
| 608285 ||  || — || September 26, 2003 || Apache Point || SDSS Collaboration ||  || align=right data-sort-value="0.62" | 620 m || 
|-id=286 bgcolor=#d6d6d6
| 608286 ||  || — || January 13, 2005 || Kitt Peak || Spacewatch ||  || align=right | 2.8 km || 
|-id=287 bgcolor=#E9E9E9
| 608287 ||  || — || September 26, 2003 || Apache Point || SDSS Collaboration ||  || align=right | 1.9 km || 
|-id=288 bgcolor=#d6d6d6
| 608288 ||  || — || September 26, 2003 || Apache Point || SDSS Collaboration ||  || align=right | 2.9 km || 
|-id=289 bgcolor=#d6d6d6
| 608289 ||  || — || September 26, 2003 || Apache Point || SDSS Collaboration ||  || align=right | 2.5 km || 
|-id=290 bgcolor=#d6d6d6
| 608290 ||  || — || September 26, 2003 || Apache Point || SDSS Collaboration || VER || align=right | 2.0 km || 
|-id=291 bgcolor=#E9E9E9
| 608291 ||  || — || September 26, 2003 || Apache Point || SDSS Collaboration ||  || align=right | 1.5 km || 
|-id=292 bgcolor=#d6d6d6
| 608292 ||  || — || September 27, 2003 || Apache Point || SDSS Collaboration || URS || align=right | 2.4 km || 
|-id=293 bgcolor=#d6d6d6
| 608293 ||  || — || January 17, 2005 || Kitt Peak || Spacewatch || EOS || align=right | 2.3 km || 
|-id=294 bgcolor=#E9E9E9
| 608294 ||  || — || September 28, 2003 || Kitt Peak || Spacewatch ||  || align=right | 1.2 km || 
|-id=295 bgcolor=#d6d6d6
| 608295 ||  || — || September 27, 2003 || Kitt Peak || Spacewatch ||  || align=right | 2.5 km || 
|-id=296 bgcolor=#E9E9E9
| 608296 ||  || — || September 28, 2003 || Apache Point || SDSS Collaboration ||  || align=right | 1.4 km || 
|-id=297 bgcolor=#E9E9E9
| 608297 ||  || — || September 28, 2003 || Apache Point || SDSS Collaboration ||  || align=right data-sort-value="0.97" | 970 m || 
|-id=298 bgcolor=#E9E9E9
| 608298 ||  || — || February 12, 2005 || La Silla || A. Boattini ||  || align=right | 1.4 km || 
|-id=299 bgcolor=#E9E9E9
| 608299 ||  || — || September 29, 2003 || Kitt Peak || Spacewatch ||  || align=right | 1.1 km || 
|-id=300 bgcolor=#E9E9E9
| 608300 ||  || — || September 28, 2003 || Apache Point || SDSS Collaboration ||  || align=right | 1.3 km || 
|}

608301–608400 

|-bgcolor=#E9E9E9
| 608301 ||  || — || September 30, 2003 || Kitt Peak || Spacewatch ||  || align=right | 1.1 km || 
|-id=302 bgcolor=#d6d6d6
| 608302 ||  || — || September 28, 2003 || Apache Point || SDSS Collaboration ||  || align=right | 2.9 km || 
|-id=303 bgcolor=#E9E9E9
| 608303 ||  || — || December 3, 2005 || Mauna Kea || Mauna Kea Obs. ||  || align=right | 1.3 km || 
|-id=304 bgcolor=#fefefe
| 608304 ||  || — || April 26, 2006 || Mount Lemmon || Mount Lemmon Survey ||  || align=right data-sort-value="0.62" | 620 m || 
|-id=305 bgcolor=#E9E9E9
| 608305 ||  || — || March 25, 2006 || Mount Lemmon || Mount Lemmon Survey ||  || align=right | 1.1 km || 
|-id=306 bgcolor=#fefefe
| 608306 ||  || — || March 4, 2005 || Kitt Peak || Spacewatch ||  || align=right data-sort-value="0.57" | 570 m || 
|-id=307 bgcolor=#E9E9E9
| 608307 ||  || — || August 26, 2003 || Cerro Tololo || Cerro Tololo Obs. ||  || align=right | 1.4 km || 
|-id=308 bgcolor=#fefefe
| 608308 ||  || — || September 20, 2003 || Kitt Peak || Spacewatch ||  || align=right data-sort-value="0.65" | 650 m || 
|-id=309 bgcolor=#E9E9E9
| 608309 ||  || — || January 7, 2014 || Mount Lemmon || Mount Lemmon Survey ||  || align=right | 1.5 km || 
|-id=310 bgcolor=#E9E9E9
| 608310 ||  || — || September 18, 2003 || Palomar || NEAT ||  || align=right | 1.3 km || 
|-id=311 bgcolor=#fefefe
| 608311 ||  || — || September 29, 2003 || Kitt Peak || Spacewatch ||  || align=right data-sort-value="0.66" | 660 m || 
|-id=312 bgcolor=#fefefe
| 608312 ||  || — || September 22, 2003 || Kitt Peak || Spacewatch ||  || align=right data-sort-value="0.74" | 740 m || 
|-id=313 bgcolor=#d6d6d6
| 608313 ||  || — || January 8, 2011 || Mount Lemmon || Mount Lemmon Survey ||  || align=right | 2.5 km || 
|-id=314 bgcolor=#fefefe
| 608314 ||  || — || November 1, 2010 || Mount Lemmon || Mount Lemmon Survey ||  || align=right data-sort-value="0.58" | 580 m || 
|-id=315 bgcolor=#E9E9E9
| 608315 ||  || — || September 11, 2007 || Mount Lemmon || Mount Lemmon Survey ||  || align=right data-sort-value="0.98" | 980 m || 
|-id=316 bgcolor=#fefefe
| 608316 ||  || — || September 13, 2010 || La Sagra || OAM Obs. ||  || align=right data-sort-value="0.64" | 640 m || 
|-id=317 bgcolor=#d6d6d6
| 608317 ||  || — || December 25, 2005 || Mount Lemmon || Mount Lemmon Survey ||  || align=right | 2.7 km || 
|-id=318 bgcolor=#d6d6d6
| 608318 ||  || — || October 23, 2009 || Mount Lemmon || Mount Lemmon Survey ||  || align=right | 2.7 km || 
|-id=319 bgcolor=#fefefe
| 608319 ||  || — || September 21, 2003 || Kitt Peak || Spacewatch ||  || align=right data-sort-value="0.51" | 510 m || 
|-id=320 bgcolor=#E9E9E9
| 608320 ||  || — || October 11, 2012 || Kitt Peak || Spacewatch ||  || align=right | 1.4 km || 
|-id=321 bgcolor=#fefefe
| 608321 ||  || — || September 27, 2003 || Kitt Peak || Spacewatch ||  || align=right data-sort-value="0.61" | 610 m || 
|-id=322 bgcolor=#fefefe
| 608322 ||  || — || September 28, 2003 || Kitt Peak || Spacewatch ||  || align=right data-sort-value="0.63" | 630 m || 
|-id=323 bgcolor=#d6d6d6
| 608323 ||  || — || April 22, 2007 || Mount Lemmon || Mount Lemmon Survey ||  || align=right | 2.7 km || 
|-id=324 bgcolor=#E9E9E9
| 608324 ||  || — || November 19, 2008 || Mount Lemmon || Mount Lemmon Survey ||  || align=right | 1.5 km || 
|-id=325 bgcolor=#E9E9E9
| 608325 ||  || — || December 4, 2008 || Kitt Peak || Spacewatch ||  || align=right | 1.3 km || 
|-id=326 bgcolor=#d6d6d6
| 608326 ||  || — || March 13, 2001 || Prescott || P. G. Comba ||  || align=right | 3.3 km || 
|-id=327 bgcolor=#E9E9E9
| 608327 ||  || — || March 26, 2014 || Mount Lemmon || Mount Lemmon Survey ||  || align=right | 1.3 km || 
|-id=328 bgcolor=#d6d6d6
| 608328 ||  || — || December 10, 2010 || Mount Lemmon || Mount Lemmon Survey ||  || align=right | 2.8 km || 
|-id=329 bgcolor=#d6d6d6
| 608329 ||  || — || September 19, 2003 || Kitt Peak || Spacewatch ||  || align=right | 2.2 km || 
|-id=330 bgcolor=#E9E9E9
| 608330 ||  || — || February 9, 2005 || Kitt Peak || Spacewatch ||  || align=right | 1.3 km || 
|-id=331 bgcolor=#E9E9E9
| 608331 ||  || — || September 28, 2003 || Kitt Peak || Spacewatch ||  || align=right | 1.3 km || 
|-id=332 bgcolor=#E9E9E9
| 608332 ||  || — || September 18, 2003 || Kitt Peak || Spacewatch ||  || align=right | 1.5 km || 
|-id=333 bgcolor=#E9E9E9
| 608333 ||  || — || September 27, 2016 || Mount Lemmon || Mount Lemmon Survey ||  || align=right | 1.4 km || 
|-id=334 bgcolor=#E9E9E9
| 608334 ||  || — || September 30, 2003 || Kitt Peak || Spacewatch ||  || align=right | 1.3 km || 
|-id=335 bgcolor=#d6d6d6
| 608335 ||  || — || October 1, 2014 || Haleakala || Pan-STARRS ||  || align=right | 2.6 km || 
|-id=336 bgcolor=#fefefe
| 608336 ||  || — || May 6, 2006 || Mount Lemmon || Mount Lemmon Survey ||  || align=right data-sort-value="0.69" | 690 m || 
|-id=337 bgcolor=#d6d6d6
| 608337 ||  || — || September 18, 2003 || Kitt Peak || Spacewatch ||  || align=right | 2.6 km || 
|-id=338 bgcolor=#E9E9E9
| 608338 ||  || — || February 4, 2005 || Mount Lemmon || Mount Lemmon Survey ||  || align=right | 1.0 km || 
|-id=339 bgcolor=#fefefe
| 608339 ||  || — || September 9, 2010 || Kitt Peak || Spacewatch ||  || align=right data-sort-value="0.48" | 480 m || 
|-id=340 bgcolor=#E9E9E9
| 608340 ||  || — || February 9, 2005 || Kitt Peak || Spacewatch ||  || align=right | 1.2 km || 
|-id=341 bgcolor=#E9E9E9
| 608341 ||  || — || October 10, 2012 || Haleakala || Pan-STARRS ||  || align=right | 1.3 km || 
|-id=342 bgcolor=#E9E9E9
| 608342 ||  || — || September 23, 2003 || Palomar || NEAT ||  || align=right | 1.5 km || 
|-id=343 bgcolor=#d6d6d6
| 608343 ||  || — || February 7, 2011 || Mount Lemmon || Mount Lemmon Survey ||  || align=right | 2.7 km || 
|-id=344 bgcolor=#E9E9E9
| 608344 ||  || — || June 27, 2011 || Mount Lemmon || Mount Lemmon Survey ||  || align=right | 1.0 km || 
|-id=345 bgcolor=#d6d6d6
| 608345 ||  || — || January 13, 2011 || Mount Lemmon || Mount Lemmon Survey ||  || align=right | 2.8 km || 
|-id=346 bgcolor=#d6d6d6
| 608346 ||  || — || September 20, 2003 || Kitt Peak || Spacewatch ||  || align=right | 2.3 km || 
|-id=347 bgcolor=#fefefe
| 608347 ||  || — || September 30, 2003 || Kitt Peak || Spacewatch ||  || align=right data-sort-value="0.72" | 720 m || 
|-id=348 bgcolor=#E9E9E9
| 608348 ||  || — || July 25, 2015 || Haleakala || Pan-STARRS ||  || align=right data-sort-value="0.98" | 980 m || 
|-id=349 bgcolor=#d6d6d6
| 608349 ||  || — || July 30, 2014 || Kitt Peak || Spacewatch ||  || align=right | 2.4 km || 
|-id=350 bgcolor=#E9E9E9
| 608350 ||  || — || October 26, 2016 || Haleakala || Pan-STARRS ||  || align=right data-sort-value="0.95" | 950 m || 
|-id=351 bgcolor=#fefefe
| 608351 ||  || — || September 28, 2003 || Apache Point || SDSS Collaboration ||  || align=right data-sort-value="0.52" | 520 m || 
|-id=352 bgcolor=#d6d6d6
| 608352 ||  || — || February 25, 2006 || Kitt Peak || Spacewatch ||  || align=right | 2.3 km || 
|-id=353 bgcolor=#d6d6d6
| 608353 ||  || — || September 18, 2003 || Palomar || NEAT ||  || align=right | 2.6 km || 
|-id=354 bgcolor=#d6d6d6
| 608354 ||  || — || September 28, 2003 || Kitt Peak || Spacewatch ||  || align=right | 2.3 km || 
|-id=355 bgcolor=#d6d6d6
| 608355 ||  || — || September 21, 2003 || Palomar || NEAT ||  || align=right | 2.9 km || 
|-id=356 bgcolor=#d6d6d6
| 608356 ||  || — || August 10, 2011 || Haleakala || Pan-STARRS || 3:2 || align=right | 3.1 km || 
|-id=357 bgcolor=#E9E9E9
| 608357 ||  || — || November 12, 2012 || Mount Lemmon || Mount Lemmon Survey ||  || align=right | 1.1 km || 
|-id=358 bgcolor=#E9E9E9
| 608358 ||  || — || April 23, 2015 || Haleakala || Pan-STARRS ||  || align=right | 1.2 km || 
|-id=359 bgcolor=#fefefe
| 608359 ||  || — || March 10, 2005 || Kitt Peak || M. W. Buie, L. H. Wasserman ||  || align=right data-sort-value="0.51" | 510 m || 
|-id=360 bgcolor=#E9E9E9
| 608360 ||  || — || July 13, 2016 || Mount Lemmon || Mount Lemmon Survey ||  || align=right | 1.4 km || 
|-id=361 bgcolor=#d6d6d6
| 608361 ||  || — || March 30, 2012 || Kitt Peak || Spacewatch ||  || align=right | 2.6 km || 
|-id=362 bgcolor=#d6d6d6
| 608362 ||  || — || August 20, 2014 || Haleakala || Pan-STARRS ||  || align=right | 2.6 km || 
|-id=363 bgcolor=#d6d6d6
| 608363 ||  || — || September 19, 2003 || Palomar || NEAT ||  || align=right | 3.6 km || 
|-id=364 bgcolor=#d6d6d6
| 608364 ||  || — || September 20, 2003 || Kitt Peak || Spacewatch ||  || align=right | 3.0 km || 
|-id=365 bgcolor=#d6d6d6
| 608365 ||  || — || January 30, 2011 || Haleakala || Pan-STARRS ||  || align=right | 2.3 km || 
|-id=366 bgcolor=#d6d6d6
| 608366 ||  || — || January 30, 2012 || Mount Lemmon || Mount Lemmon Survey ||  || align=right | 2.5 km || 
|-id=367 bgcolor=#E9E9E9
| 608367 ||  || — || February 20, 2014 || Mount Lemmon || Mount Lemmon Survey ||  || align=right | 1.2 km || 
|-id=368 bgcolor=#d6d6d6
| 608368 ||  || — || January 10, 2018 || Haleakala || Pan-STARRS ||  || align=right | 2.6 km || 
|-id=369 bgcolor=#E9E9E9
| 608369 ||  || — || December 4, 2016 || Mount Lemmon || Mount Lemmon Survey ||  || align=right | 1.0 km || 
|-id=370 bgcolor=#d6d6d6
| 608370 ||  || — || August 27, 2014 || Haleakala || Pan-STARRS ||  || align=right | 2.2 km || 
|-id=371 bgcolor=#E9E9E9
| 608371 ||  || — || February 9, 2014 || Mount Lemmon || Mount Lemmon Survey ||  || align=right | 1.2 km || 
|-id=372 bgcolor=#d6d6d6
| 608372 ||  || — || September 4, 2014 || Haleakala || Pan-STARRS ||  || align=right | 2.2 km || 
|-id=373 bgcolor=#E9E9E9
| 608373 ||  || — || September 30, 2003 || Kitt Peak || Spacewatch ||  || align=right | 1.3 km || 
|-id=374 bgcolor=#fefefe
| 608374 ||  || — || March 2, 2016 || Mount Lemmon || Mount Lemmon Survey ||  || align=right data-sort-value="0.57" | 570 m || 
|-id=375 bgcolor=#fefefe
| 608375 ||  || — || September 16, 2003 || Kitt Peak || Spacewatch ||  || align=right data-sort-value="0.48" | 480 m || 
|-id=376 bgcolor=#d6d6d6
| 608376 ||  || — || September 30, 2003 || Kitt Peak || Spacewatch ||  || align=right | 2.6 km || 
|-id=377 bgcolor=#E9E9E9
| 608377 ||  || — || September 18, 2003 || Kitt Peak || Spacewatch ||  || align=right data-sort-value="0.96" | 960 m || 
|-id=378 bgcolor=#E9E9E9
| 608378 ||  || — || September 19, 2003 || Kitt Peak || Spacewatch ||  || align=right | 1.1 km || 
|-id=379 bgcolor=#E9E9E9
| 608379 ||  || — || September 29, 2003 || Kitt Peak || Spacewatch ||  || align=right | 1.0 km || 
|-id=380 bgcolor=#E9E9E9
| 608380 ||  || — || September 29, 2003 || Kitt Peak || Spacewatch ||  || align=right | 1.1 km || 
|-id=381 bgcolor=#d6d6d6
| 608381 ||  || — || September 28, 2003 || Apache Point || SDSS Collaboration ||  || align=right | 2.4 km || 
|-id=382 bgcolor=#E9E9E9
| 608382 ||  || — || September 28, 2003 || Kitt Peak || Spacewatch ||  || align=right | 1.0 km || 
|-id=383 bgcolor=#E9E9E9
| 608383 ||  || — || August 24, 2003 || Cerro Tololo || Cerro Tololo Obs. ||  || align=right data-sort-value="0.92" | 920 m || 
|-id=384 bgcolor=#d6d6d6
| 608384 ||  || — || September 29, 2003 || Kitt Peak || Spacewatch ||  || align=right | 2.2 km || 
|-id=385 bgcolor=#d6d6d6
| 608385 ||  || — || September 18, 2003 || Kitt Peak || Spacewatch ||  || align=right | 2.0 km || 
|-id=386 bgcolor=#E9E9E9
| 608386 ||  || — || September 22, 2003 || Kitt Peak || Spacewatch ||  || align=right | 1.1 km || 
|-id=387 bgcolor=#d6d6d6
| 608387 ||  || — || September 19, 2003 || Kitt Peak || Spacewatch ||  || align=right | 1.8 km || 
|-id=388 bgcolor=#E9E9E9
| 608388 ||  || — || September 16, 2003 || Kitt Peak || Spacewatch ||  || align=right | 1.0 km || 
|-id=389 bgcolor=#d6d6d6
| 608389 ||  || — || September 26, 2003 || Apache Point || SDSS Collaboration ||  || align=right | 2.4 km || 
|-id=390 bgcolor=#fefefe
| 608390 ||  || — || September 18, 2003 || Kitt Peak || Spacewatch ||  || align=right data-sort-value="0.70" | 700 m || 
|-id=391 bgcolor=#fefefe
| 608391 ||  || — || October 1, 2003 || Kitt Peak || Spacewatch ||  || align=right data-sort-value="0.64" | 640 m || 
|-id=392 bgcolor=#d6d6d6
| 608392 ||  || — || October 2, 2003 || Kitt Peak || Spacewatch ||  || align=right | 2.4 km || 
|-id=393 bgcolor=#E9E9E9
| 608393 ||  || — || October 3, 2003 || Kitt Peak || Spacewatch ||  || align=right | 1.2 km || 
|-id=394 bgcolor=#fefefe
| 608394 ||  || — || October 15, 2003 || Palomar || NEAT ||  || align=right | 1.2 km || 
|-id=395 bgcolor=#d6d6d6
| 608395 ||  || — || October 1, 2003 || Kitt Peak || Spacewatch ||  || align=right | 2.3 km || 
|-id=396 bgcolor=#E9E9E9
| 608396 ||  || — || October 1, 2003 || Kitt Peak || Spacewatch ||  || align=right | 1.2 km || 
|-id=397 bgcolor=#E9E9E9
| 608397 ||  || — || September 25, 2003 || Palomar || NEAT ||  || align=right data-sort-value="0.94" | 940 m || 
|-id=398 bgcolor=#d6d6d6
| 608398 ||  || — || October 1, 2003 || Kitt Peak || Spacewatch ||  || align=right | 2.3 km || 
|-id=399 bgcolor=#d6d6d6
| 608399 ||  || — || October 1, 2003 || Kitt Peak || Spacewatch ||  || align=right | 1.9 km || 
|-id=400 bgcolor=#E9E9E9
| 608400 ||  || — || October 1, 2003 || Kitt Peak || Spacewatch ||  || align=right | 1.2 km || 
|}

608401–608500 

|-bgcolor=#E9E9E9
| 608401 ||  || — || October 1, 2003 || Kitt Peak || Spacewatch ||  || align=right | 1.5 km || 
|-id=402 bgcolor=#d6d6d6
| 608402 ||  || — || October 1, 2003 || Kitt Peak || Spacewatch ||  || align=right | 2.6 km || 
|-id=403 bgcolor=#d6d6d6
| 608403 ||  || — || October 1, 2003 || Kitt Peak || Spacewatch ||  || align=right | 2.9 km || 
|-id=404 bgcolor=#d6d6d6
| 608404 ||  || — || October 2, 2003 || Kitt Peak || Spacewatch ||  || align=right | 2.8 km || 
|-id=405 bgcolor=#d6d6d6
| 608405 ||  || — || October 2, 2003 || Kitt Peak || Spacewatch ||  || align=right | 2.9 km || 
|-id=406 bgcolor=#d6d6d6
| 608406 ||  || — || October 2, 2003 || Kitt Peak || Spacewatch ||  || align=right | 2.3 km || 
|-id=407 bgcolor=#d6d6d6
| 608407 ||  || — || October 2, 2003 || Kitt Peak || Spacewatch ||  || align=right | 3.2 km || 
|-id=408 bgcolor=#d6d6d6
| 608408 ||  || — || September 21, 2003 || Kitt Peak || Spacewatch || VER || align=right | 2.4 km || 
|-id=409 bgcolor=#d6d6d6
| 608409 ||  || — || October 3, 2003 || Kitt Peak || Spacewatch ||  || align=right | 3.1 km || 
|-id=410 bgcolor=#d6d6d6
| 608410 ||  || — || September 19, 2003 || Kitt Peak || Spacewatch ||  || align=right | 2.3 km || 
|-id=411 bgcolor=#d6d6d6
| 608411 ||  || — || September 17, 2003 || Palomar || NEAT ||  || align=right | 2.8 km || 
|-id=412 bgcolor=#d6d6d6
| 608412 ||  || — || October 4, 2003 || Kitt Peak || Spacewatch ||  || align=right | 2.3 km || 
|-id=413 bgcolor=#E9E9E9
| 608413 ||  || — || October 4, 2003 || Kitt Peak || Spacewatch ||  || align=right | 1.8 km || 
|-id=414 bgcolor=#fefefe
| 608414 ||  || — || November 1, 2007 || Kitt Peak || Spacewatch ||  || align=right data-sort-value="0.92" | 920 m || 
|-id=415 bgcolor=#fefefe
| 608415 ||  || — || September 15, 2010 || Catalina || CSS ||  || align=right data-sort-value="0.77" | 770 m || 
|-id=416 bgcolor=#fefefe
| 608416 ||  || — || October 3, 2003 || Kitt Peak || Spacewatch ||  || align=right data-sort-value="0.70" | 700 m || 
|-id=417 bgcolor=#E9E9E9
| 608417 ||  || — || July 25, 2011 || Haleakala || Pan-STARRS ||  || align=right | 1.6 km || 
|-id=418 bgcolor=#d6d6d6
| 608418 ||  || — || October 23, 2009 || Mount Lemmon || Mount Lemmon Survey ||  || align=right | 2.7 km || 
|-id=419 bgcolor=#E9E9E9
| 608419 ||  || — || October 1, 2003 || Kitt Peak || Spacewatch ||  || align=right | 1.2 km || 
|-id=420 bgcolor=#d6d6d6
| 608420 ||  || — || October 1, 2003 || Kitt Peak || Spacewatch ||  || align=right | 2.0 km || 
|-id=421 bgcolor=#E9E9E9
| 608421 ||  || — || July 11, 2016 || Haleakala || Pan-STARRS ||  || align=right | 1.6 km || 
|-id=422 bgcolor=#E9E9E9
| 608422 ||  || — || October 1, 2003 || Kitt Peak || Spacewatch ||  || align=right data-sort-value="0.88" | 880 m || 
|-id=423 bgcolor=#fefefe
| 608423 ||  || — || October 4, 2003 || Kitt Peak || Spacewatch ||  || align=right data-sort-value="0.81" | 810 m || 
|-id=424 bgcolor=#d6d6d6
| 608424 ||  || — || September 24, 2008 || Mount Lemmon || Mount Lemmon Survey ||  || align=right | 1.9 km || 
|-id=425 bgcolor=#d6d6d6
| 608425 ||  || — || January 29, 2011 || Mount Lemmon || Mount Lemmon Survey ||  || align=right | 2.3 km || 
|-id=426 bgcolor=#d6d6d6
| 608426 ||  || — || August 28, 2014 || Haleakala || Pan-STARRS ||  || align=right | 2.5 km || 
|-id=427 bgcolor=#E9E9E9
| 608427 ||  || — || October 2, 2003 || Kitt Peak || Spacewatch ||  || align=right | 1.3 km || 
|-id=428 bgcolor=#d6d6d6
| 608428 ||  || — || October 1, 2003 || Kitt Peak || Spacewatch ||  || align=right | 2.3 km || 
|-id=429 bgcolor=#fefefe
| 608429 ||  || — || October 16, 2003 || Socorro || LINEAR ||  || align=right data-sort-value="0.92" | 920 m || 
|-id=430 bgcolor=#fefefe
| 608430 ||  || — || September 21, 2003 || Palomar || NEAT ||  || align=right data-sort-value="0.68" | 680 m || 
|-id=431 bgcolor=#fefefe
| 608431 ||  || — || October 17, 2003 || Kitt Peak || Spacewatch ||  || align=right data-sort-value="0.65" | 650 m || 
|-id=432 bgcolor=#fefefe
| 608432 ||  || — || October 13, 2003 || Palomar || NEAT || H || align=right data-sort-value="0.81" | 810 m || 
|-id=433 bgcolor=#E9E9E9
| 608433 ||  || — || October 16, 2003 || Palomar || NEAT ||  || align=right | 1.8 km || 
|-id=434 bgcolor=#E9E9E9
| 608434 ||  || — || October 17, 2003 || Kitt Peak || Spacewatch ||  || align=right | 1.5 km || 
|-id=435 bgcolor=#E9E9E9
| 608435 ||  || — || October 18, 2003 || Kitt Peak || Spacewatch ||  || align=right | 1.4 km || 
|-id=436 bgcolor=#E9E9E9
| 608436 ||  || — || October 16, 2003 || Palomar || NEAT ||  || align=right | 1.7 km || 
|-id=437 bgcolor=#E9E9E9
| 608437 ||  || — || October 1, 2003 || Kitt Peak || Spacewatch ||  || align=right | 1.3 km || 
|-id=438 bgcolor=#E9E9E9
| 608438 ||  || — || September 22, 2003 || Palomar || NEAT ||  || align=right | 1.5 km || 
|-id=439 bgcolor=#d6d6d6
| 608439 ||  || — || September 27, 2003 || Kitt Peak || Spacewatch ||  || align=right | 2.8 km || 
|-id=440 bgcolor=#fefefe
| 608440 ||  || — || October 18, 2003 || Kitt Peak || Spacewatch ||  || align=right data-sort-value="0.75" | 750 m || 
|-id=441 bgcolor=#E9E9E9
| 608441 ||  || — || September 22, 2003 || Kitt Peak || Spacewatch ||  || align=right | 1.5 km || 
|-id=442 bgcolor=#E9E9E9
| 608442 ||  || — || October 18, 2003 || Kitt Peak || Spacewatch ||  || align=right | 1.6 km || 
|-id=443 bgcolor=#d6d6d6
| 608443 ||  || — || September 28, 2003 || Kitt Peak || Spacewatch ||  || align=right | 2.8 km || 
|-id=444 bgcolor=#d6d6d6
| 608444 ||  || — || September 28, 2003 || Kitt Peak || Spacewatch ||  || align=right | 2.7 km || 
|-id=445 bgcolor=#E9E9E9
| 608445 ||  || — || September 23, 2003 || Palomar || NEAT ||  || align=right | 1.5 km || 
|-id=446 bgcolor=#d6d6d6
| 608446 ||  || — || October 20, 2003 || Kitt Peak || Spacewatch ||  || align=right | 2.7 km || 
|-id=447 bgcolor=#d6d6d6
| 608447 ||  || — || September 22, 2003 || Palomar || NEAT ||  || align=right | 3.6 km || 
|-id=448 bgcolor=#fefefe
| 608448 ||  || — || October 17, 2003 || Kitt Peak || Spacewatch ||  || align=right data-sort-value="0.68" | 680 m || 
|-id=449 bgcolor=#E9E9E9
| 608449 ||  || — || October 20, 2003 || Kitt Peak || Spacewatch ||  || align=right | 2.0 km || 
|-id=450 bgcolor=#E9E9E9
| 608450 ||  || — || October 20, 2003 || Kitt Peak || Spacewatch ||  || align=right | 1.2 km || 
|-id=451 bgcolor=#E9E9E9
| 608451 ||  || — || October 18, 2003 || Palomar || NEAT ||  || align=right | 2.1 km || 
|-id=452 bgcolor=#E9E9E9
| 608452 ||  || — || September 19, 2003 || Palomar || NEAT ||  || align=right | 1.9 km || 
|-id=453 bgcolor=#E9E9E9
| 608453 ||  || — || September 18, 2003 || Kitt Peak || Spacewatch ||  || align=right | 1.3 km || 
|-id=454 bgcolor=#fefefe
| 608454 ||  || — || October 20, 2003 || Kitt Peak || Spacewatch ||  || align=right data-sort-value="0.52" | 520 m || 
|-id=455 bgcolor=#E9E9E9
| 608455 ||  || — || October 20, 2003 || Kitt Peak || Spacewatch ||  || align=right | 1.1 km || 
|-id=456 bgcolor=#fefefe
| 608456 ||  || — || October 20, 2003 || Kitt Peak || Spacewatch ||  || align=right data-sort-value="0.64" | 640 m || 
|-id=457 bgcolor=#E9E9E9
| 608457 ||  || — || October 19, 2003 || Palomar || NEAT || HNS || align=right | 1.9 km || 
|-id=458 bgcolor=#fefefe
| 608458 ||  || — || September 30, 2003 || Kitt Peak || Spacewatch || NYS || align=right data-sort-value="0.40" | 400 m || 
|-id=459 bgcolor=#E9E9E9
| 608459 ||  || — || October 21, 2003 || Anderson Mesa || LONEOS ||  || align=right | 1.6 km || 
|-id=460 bgcolor=#fefefe
| 608460 ||  || — || September 20, 2003 || Palomar || NEAT ||  || align=right data-sort-value="0.60" | 600 m || 
|-id=461 bgcolor=#fefefe
| 608461 ||  || — || September 22, 2003 || Kitt Peak || Spacewatch ||  || align=right data-sort-value="0.76" | 760 m || 
|-id=462 bgcolor=#d6d6d6
| 608462 ||  || — || September 25, 2003 || Haleakala || AMOS ||  || align=right | 2.8 km || 
|-id=463 bgcolor=#E9E9E9
| 608463 ||  || — || September 22, 2003 || Kitt Peak || Spacewatch ||  || align=right | 1.3 km || 
|-id=464 bgcolor=#E9E9E9
| 608464 ||  || — || September 26, 2003 || Desert Eagle || W. K. Y. Yeung ||  || align=right | 1.2 km || 
|-id=465 bgcolor=#fefefe
| 608465 ||  || — || October 23, 2003 || Kitt Peak || Spacewatch ||  || align=right data-sort-value="0.66" | 660 m || 
|-id=466 bgcolor=#E9E9E9
| 608466 ||  || — || September 28, 2003 || Kitt Peak || Spacewatch ||  || align=right | 1.4 km || 
|-id=467 bgcolor=#E9E9E9
| 608467 ||  || — || October 19, 2003 || Kitt Peak || Spacewatch ||  || align=right | 1.4 km || 
|-id=468 bgcolor=#d6d6d6
| 608468 ||  || — || October 24, 2003 || Kitt Peak || Spacewatch ||  || align=right | 3.3 km || 
|-id=469 bgcolor=#d6d6d6
| 608469 ||  || — || September 19, 2003 || Kitt Peak || Spacewatch ||  || align=right | 2.1 km || 
|-id=470 bgcolor=#d6d6d6
| 608470 ||  || — || October 23, 2003 || Kitt Peak || Spacewatch ||  || align=right | 3.0 km || 
|-id=471 bgcolor=#E9E9E9
| 608471 ||  || — || October 24, 2003 || Socorro || LINEAR ||  || align=right | 2.4 km || 
|-id=472 bgcolor=#fefefe
| 608472 ||  || — || September 8, 2003 || Uppsala-Kvistaberg || Kvistaberg Obs. ||  || align=right | 1.1 km || 
|-id=473 bgcolor=#d6d6d6
| 608473 ||  || — || October 23, 2003 || Kitt Peak || Spacewatch ||  || align=right | 2.3 km || 
|-id=474 bgcolor=#d6d6d6
| 608474 ||  || — || October 22, 2003 || Kitt Peak || Kitt Peak Obs. ||  || align=right | 1.9 km || 
|-id=475 bgcolor=#d6d6d6
| 608475 ||  || — || October 23, 2003 || Kitt Peak || Spacewatch ||  || align=right | 2.9 km || 
|-id=476 bgcolor=#d6d6d6
| 608476 ||  || — || October 21, 2003 || Anderson Mesa || LONEOS ||  || align=right | 3.5 km || 
|-id=477 bgcolor=#d6d6d6
| 608477 ||  || — || October 16, 2003 || Kitt Peak || Spacewatch ||  || align=right | 2.2 km || 
|-id=478 bgcolor=#d6d6d6
| 608478 ||  || — || October 17, 2003 || Kitt Peak || Spacewatch ||  || align=right | 2.6 km || 
|-id=479 bgcolor=#d6d6d6
| 608479 ||  || — || October 18, 2003 || Kitt Peak || Spacewatch ||  || align=right | 2.8 km || 
|-id=480 bgcolor=#fefefe
| 608480 ||  || — || October 18, 2003 || Kitt Peak || Spacewatch ||  || align=right data-sort-value="0.47" | 470 m || 
|-id=481 bgcolor=#E9E9E9
| 608481 ||  || — || October 1, 2003 || Kitt Peak || Spacewatch ||  || align=right | 1.1 km || 
|-id=482 bgcolor=#d6d6d6
| 608482 ||  || — || October 18, 2003 || Kitt Peak || Spacewatch ||  || align=right | 2.9 km || 
|-id=483 bgcolor=#d6d6d6
| 608483 ||  || — || October 18, 2003 || Kitt Peak || Spacewatch ||  || align=right | 2.3 km || 
|-id=484 bgcolor=#d6d6d6
| 608484 ||  || — || October 18, 2003 || Anderson Mesa || LONEOS ||  || align=right | 3.4 km || 
|-id=485 bgcolor=#E9E9E9
| 608485 ||  || — || January 28, 2000 || Kitt Peak || Spacewatch ||  || align=right | 1.0 km || 
|-id=486 bgcolor=#E9E9E9
| 608486 ||  || — || October 2, 2003 || Kitt Peak || Spacewatch ||  || align=right | 1.8 km || 
|-id=487 bgcolor=#fefefe
| 608487 ||  || — || October 2, 2003 || Kitt Peak || Spacewatch ||  || align=right | 1.1 km || 
|-id=488 bgcolor=#E9E9E9
| 608488 ||  || — || September 23, 2003 || Palomar || NEAT ||  || align=right | 1.5 km || 
|-id=489 bgcolor=#E9E9E9
| 608489 ||  || — || September 20, 2003 || Palomar || NEAT ||  || align=right | 1.2 km || 
|-id=490 bgcolor=#d6d6d6
| 608490 ||  || — || January 16, 2005 || Kitt Peak || Spacewatch ||  || align=right | 3.2 km || 
|-id=491 bgcolor=#fefefe
| 608491 ||  || — || September 28, 2003 || Anderson Mesa || LONEOS ||  || align=right data-sort-value="0.57" | 570 m || 
|-id=492 bgcolor=#E9E9E9
| 608492 ||  || — || August 27, 2003 || Palomar || NEAT ||  || align=right | 1.3 km || 
|-id=493 bgcolor=#d6d6d6
| 608493 ||  || — || December 11, 2004 || Kitt Peak || Spacewatch ||  || align=right | 2.9 km || 
|-id=494 bgcolor=#d6d6d6
| 608494 ||  || — || September 27, 2003 || Kitt Peak || Spacewatch || 3:2 || align=right | 5.4 km || 
|-id=495 bgcolor=#d6d6d6
| 608495 ||  || — || October 17, 2003 || Apache Point || SDSS Collaboration ||  || align=right | 2.4 km || 
|-id=496 bgcolor=#d6d6d6
| 608496 ||  || — || August 28, 2003 || Palomar || NEAT ||  || align=right | 3.1 km || 
|-id=497 bgcolor=#d6d6d6
| 608497 ||  || — || October 17, 2003 || Apache Point || SDSS Collaboration || 3:2 || align=right | 3.6 km || 
|-id=498 bgcolor=#d6d6d6
| 608498 ||  || — || September 20, 2003 || Kitt Peak || Spacewatch ||  || align=right | 2.7 km || 
|-id=499 bgcolor=#d6d6d6
| 608499 ||  || — || October 17, 2003 || Apache Point || SDSS Collaboration ||  || align=right | 3.0 km || 
|-id=500 bgcolor=#E9E9E9
| 608500 ||  || — || August 26, 2003 || Cerro Tololo || Cerro Tololo Obs. ||  || align=right | 1.3 km || 
|}

608501–608600 

|-bgcolor=#E9E9E9
| 608501 ||  || — || January 16, 2005 || Kitt Peak || Spacewatch || ADE || align=right | 2.0 km || 
|-id=502 bgcolor=#E9E9E9
| 608502 ||  || — || October 18, 2003 || Apache Point || SDSS Collaboration ||  || align=right | 1.0 km || 
|-id=503 bgcolor=#E9E9E9
| 608503 ||  || — || December 14, 2004 || Kitt Peak || Spacewatch ||  || align=right | 1.0 km || 
|-id=504 bgcolor=#E9E9E9
| 608504 ||  || — || October 18, 2003 || Apache Point || SDSS Collaboration ||  || align=right | 1.7 km || 
|-id=505 bgcolor=#E9E9E9
| 608505 ||  || — || February 4, 2005 || Mount Lemmon || Mount Lemmon Survey ||  || align=right | 1.5 km || 
|-id=506 bgcolor=#E9E9E9
| 608506 ||  || — || October 18, 2003 || Kitt Peak || Spacewatch ||  || align=right | 1.2 km || 
|-id=507 bgcolor=#fefefe
| 608507 ||  || — || October 20, 2003 || Kitt Peak || Spacewatch ||  || align=right data-sort-value="0.54" | 540 m || 
|-id=508 bgcolor=#d6d6d6
| 608508 ||  || — || October 17, 2003 || Apache Point || SDSS Collaboration ||  || align=right | 3.2 km || 
|-id=509 bgcolor=#d6d6d6
| 608509 ||  || — || October 17, 2003 || Apache Point || SDSS Collaboration ||  || align=right | 2.8 km || 
|-id=510 bgcolor=#E9E9E9
| 608510 ||  || — || January 16, 2005 || Kitt Peak || Spacewatch ||  || align=right | 1.4 km || 
|-id=511 bgcolor=#E9E9E9
| 608511 ||  || — || October 19, 2003 || Apache Point || SDSS Collaboration ||  || align=right | 1.0 km || 
|-id=512 bgcolor=#d6d6d6
| 608512 ||  || — || September 28, 2003 || Apache Point || SDSS Collaboration ||  || align=right | 2.9 km || 
|-id=513 bgcolor=#E9E9E9
| 608513 ||  || — || February 4, 2005 || Kitt Peak || Spacewatch ||  || align=right | 1.2 km || 
|-id=514 bgcolor=#d6d6d6
| 608514 ||  || — || September 27, 2003 || Kitt Peak || Spacewatch ||  || align=right | 3.1 km || 
|-id=515 bgcolor=#E9E9E9
| 608515 ||  || — || September 21, 2003 || Kitt Peak || Spacewatch ||  || align=right | 1.4 km || 
|-id=516 bgcolor=#d6d6d6
| 608516 ||  || — || October 20, 2003 || Kitt Peak || Spacewatch ||  || align=right | 2.4 km || 
|-id=517 bgcolor=#E9E9E9
| 608517 ||  || — || October 20, 2003 || Kitt Peak || Spacewatch ||  || align=right | 1.7 km || 
|-id=518 bgcolor=#E9E9E9
| 608518 ||  || — || October 20, 2003 || Kitt Peak || Spacewatch ||  || align=right | 1.7 km || 
|-id=519 bgcolor=#d6d6d6
| 608519 ||  || — || October 21, 2003 || Kitt Peak || Spacewatch ||  || align=right | 2.4 km || 
|-id=520 bgcolor=#E9E9E9
| 608520 ||  || — || October 21, 2003 || Kitt Peak || Spacewatch ||  || align=right | 1.4 km || 
|-id=521 bgcolor=#fefefe
| 608521 ||  || — || October 21, 2003 || Kitt Peak || Spacewatch ||  || align=right data-sort-value="0.59" | 590 m || 
|-id=522 bgcolor=#d6d6d6
| 608522 ||  || — || November 20, 2004 || Kitt Peak || Spacewatch ||  || align=right | 2.9 km || 
|-id=523 bgcolor=#E9E9E9
| 608523 ||  || — || October 17, 2003 || Apache Point || SDSS Collaboration || EUN || align=right data-sort-value="0.93" | 930 m || 
|-id=524 bgcolor=#d6d6d6
| 608524 ||  || — || August 23, 2003 || Palomar || NEAT ||  || align=right | 2.5 km || 
|-id=525 bgcolor=#E9E9E9
| 608525 ||  || — || September 21, 2003 || Kitt Peak || Spacewatch ||  || align=right | 1.0 km || 
|-id=526 bgcolor=#d6d6d6
| 608526 ||  || — || September 28, 2003 || Kitt Peak || Spacewatch ||  || align=right | 2.2 km || 
|-id=527 bgcolor=#d6d6d6
| 608527 ||  || — || October 22, 2003 || Apache Point || SDSS Collaboration ||  || align=right | 2.6 km || 
|-id=528 bgcolor=#d6d6d6
| 608528 ||  || — || September 20, 2003 || Kitt Peak || Spacewatch ||  || align=right | 2.2 km || 
|-id=529 bgcolor=#fefefe
| 608529 ||  || — || October 18, 2003 || Apache Point || SDSS Collaboration ||  || align=right data-sort-value="0.61" | 610 m || 
|-id=530 bgcolor=#d6d6d6
| 608530 ||  || — || October 20, 2003 || Kitt Peak || Spacewatch ||  || align=right | 3.6 km || 
|-id=531 bgcolor=#d6d6d6
| 608531 ||  || — || September 19, 2003 || Kitt Peak || Spacewatch ||  || align=right | 3.0 km || 
|-id=532 bgcolor=#E9E9E9
| 608532 ||  || — || September 29, 2003 || Kitt Peak || Spacewatch ||  || align=right | 1.5 km || 
|-id=533 bgcolor=#E9E9E9
| 608533 ||  || — || September 18, 2003 || Kitt Peak || Spacewatch ||  || align=right | 1.2 km || 
|-id=534 bgcolor=#d6d6d6
| 608534 ||  || — || September 28, 2003 || Apache Point || SDSS Collaboration ||  || align=right | 2.3 km || 
|-id=535 bgcolor=#d6d6d6
| 608535 ||  || — || October 22, 2003 || Apache Point || SDSS Collaboration ||  || align=right | 2.7 km || 
|-id=536 bgcolor=#d6d6d6
| 608536 ||  || — || September 18, 2003 || Kitt Peak || Spacewatch || Tj (2.94) || align=right | 2.6 km || 
|-id=537 bgcolor=#fefefe
| 608537 ||  || — || October 22, 2003 || Apache Point || SDSS Collaboration ||  || align=right data-sort-value="0.72" | 720 m || 
|-id=538 bgcolor=#d6d6d6
| 608538 ||  || — || October 22, 2003 || Apache Point || SDSS Collaboration ||  || align=right | 2.0 km || 
|-id=539 bgcolor=#d6d6d6
| 608539 ||  || — || October 22, 2003 || Apache Point || SDSS Collaboration ||  || align=right | 2.6 km || 
|-id=540 bgcolor=#d6d6d6
| 608540 ||  || — || September 30, 2003 || Apache Point || SDSS Collaboration ||  || align=right | 2.6 km || 
|-id=541 bgcolor=#d6d6d6
| 608541 ||  || — || October 22, 2003 || Apache Point || SDSS Collaboration ||  || align=right | 2.4 km || 
|-id=542 bgcolor=#E9E9E9
| 608542 ||  || — || September 27, 2003 || Apache Point || SDSS Collaboration ||  || align=right | 1.8 km || 
|-id=543 bgcolor=#fefefe
| 608543 ||  || — || September 28, 2003 || Apache Point || SDSS Collaboration ||  || align=right data-sort-value="0.48" | 480 m || 
|-id=544 bgcolor=#E9E9E9
| 608544 ||  || — || October 22, 2003 || Apache Point || SDSS Collaboration ||  || align=right | 1.5 km || 
|-id=545 bgcolor=#d6d6d6
| 608545 ||  || — || October 22, 2003 || Apache Point || SDSS Collaboration ||  || align=right | 2.6 km || 
|-id=546 bgcolor=#d6d6d6
| 608546 ||  || — || October 22, 2003 || Apache Point || SDSS Collaboration ||  || align=right | 2.6 km || 
|-id=547 bgcolor=#d6d6d6
| 608547 ||  || — || October 22, 2003 || Apache Point || SDSS Collaboration ||  || align=right | 2.2 km || 
|-id=548 bgcolor=#d6d6d6
| 608548 ||  || — || December 19, 2004 || Mount Lemmon || Mount Lemmon Survey ||  || align=right | 3.9 km || 
|-id=549 bgcolor=#E9E9E9
| 608549 ||  || — || October 22, 2003 || Apache Point || SDSS Collaboration ||  || align=right | 1.3 km || 
|-id=550 bgcolor=#d6d6d6
| 608550 ||  || — || October 22, 2003 || Apache Point || SDSS Collaboration ||  || align=right | 2.5 km || 
|-id=551 bgcolor=#d6d6d6
| 608551 ||  || — || December 19, 2004 || Mount Lemmon || Mount Lemmon Survey || EOS || align=right | 2.6 km || 
|-id=552 bgcolor=#E9E9E9
| 608552 ||  || — || October 22, 2003 || Apache Point || SDSS Collaboration ||  || align=right | 1.5 km || 
|-id=553 bgcolor=#d6d6d6
| 608553 ||  || — || October 22, 2003 || Apache Point || SDSS Collaboration ||  || align=right | 2.4 km || 
|-id=554 bgcolor=#d6d6d6
| 608554 ||  || — || October 22, 2003 || Apache Point || SDSS Collaboration ||  || align=right | 2.5 km || 
|-id=555 bgcolor=#E9E9E9
| 608555 ||  || — || October 22, 2003 || Apache Point || SDSS Collaboration ||  || align=right | 1.3 km || 
|-id=556 bgcolor=#d6d6d6
| 608556 ||  || — || October 16, 2003 || Kitt Peak || Spacewatch ||  || align=right | 3.0 km || 
|-id=557 bgcolor=#E9E9E9
| 608557 ||  || — || September 30, 2003 || Kitt Peak || Spacewatch ||  || align=right | 1.3 km || 
|-id=558 bgcolor=#E9E9E9
| 608558 ||  || — || October 18, 2003 || Apache Point || SDSS Collaboration ||  || align=right | 1.6 km || 
|-id=559 bgcolor=#E9E9E9
| 608559 ||  || — || September 28, 2003 || Kitt Peak || Spacewatch ||  || align=right | 2.3 km || 
|-id=560 bgcolor=#E9E9E9
| 608560 ||  || — || September 28, 2003 || Anderson Mesa || LONEOS ||  || align=right | 1.6 km || 
|-id=561 bgcolor=#E9E9E9
| 608561 ||  || — || October 23, 2003 || Apache Point || SDSS Collaboration ||  || align=right | 1.0 km || 
|-id=562 bgcolor=#d6d6d6
| 608562 ||  || — || October 19, 2003 || Apache Point || SDSS Collaboration ||  || align=right | 2.9 km || 
|-id=563 bgcolor=#E9E9E9
| 608563 ||  || — || October 23, 2003 || Kitt Peak || Spacewatch ||  || align=right | 1.8 km || 
|-id=564 bgcolor=#E9E9E9
| 608564 ||  || — || February 2, 2005 || Kitt Peak || Spacewatch ||  || align=right | 1.4 km || 
|-id=565 bgcolor=#d6d6d6
| 608565 ||  || — || October 23, 2003 || Apache Point || SDSS Collaboration ||  || align=right | 2.2 km || 
|-id=566 bgcolor=#d6d6d6
| 608566 ||  || — || October 23, 2003 || Apache Point || SDSS Collaboration ||  || align=right | 2.1 km || 
|-id=567 bgcolor=#d6d6d6
| 608567 ||  || — || October 23, 2003 || Apache Point || SDSS Collaboration ||  || align=right | 2.1 km || 
|-id=568 bgcolor=#E9E9E9
| 608568 ||  || — || April 2, 2005 || Catalina || CSS ||  || align=right | 1.5 km || 
|-id=569 bgcolor=#d6d6d6
| 608569 ||  || — || September 18, 2003 || Kitt Peak || Spacewatch ||  || align=right | 2.5 km || 
|-id=570 bgcolor=#d6d6d6
| 608570 ||  || — || August 28, 2003 || Palomar || NEAT ||  || align=right | 3.7 km || 
|-id=571 bgcolor=#fefefe
| 608571 ||  || — || November 16, 2003 || Kitt Peak || Spacewatch ||  || align=right data-sort-value="0.77" | 770 m || 
|-id=572 bgcolor=#fefefe
| 608572 ||  || — || October 20, 2003 || Kitt Peak || Spacewatch ||  || align=right data-sort-value="0.70" | 700 m || 
|-id=573 bgcolor=#fefefe
| 608573 ||  || — || October 29, 2003 || Kitt Peak || Spacewatch ||  || align=right data-sort-value="0.75" | 750 m || 
|-id=574 bgcolor=#E9E9E9
| 608574 ||  || — || October 23, 2003 || Kitt Peak || Spacewatch ||  || align=right | 1.4 km || 
|-id=575 bgcolor=#fefefe
| 608575 ||  || — || October 11, 2010 || Mount Lemmon || Mount Lemmon Survey ||  || align=right data-sort-value="0.80" | 800 m || 
|-id=576 bgcolor=#fefefe
| 608576 ||  || — || December 15, 2007 || Mount Lemmon || Mount Lemmon Survey ||  || align=right data-sort-value="0.68" | 680 m || 
|-id=577 bgcolor=#fefefe
| 608577 ||  || — || October 23, 2003 || Kitt Peak || L. H. Wasserman, D. E. Trilling ||  || align=right data-sort-value="0.68" | 680 m || 
|-id=578 bgcolor=#fefefe
| 608578 ||  || — || April 29, 2009 || Kitt Peak || Spacewatch ||  || align=right data-sort-value="0.62" | 620 m || 
|-id=579 bgcolor=#d6d6d6
| 608579 ||  || — || May 30, 2008 || Mount Lemmon || Mount Lemmon Survey ||  || align=right | 3.6 km || 
|-id=580 bgcolor=#E9E9E9
| 608580 ||  || — || December 11, 2012 || Mount Lemmon || Mount Lemmon Survey ||  || align=right | 1.2 km || 
|-id=581 bgcolor=#d6d6d6
| 608581 ||  || — || January 5, 2006 || Mount Lemmon || Mount Lemmon Survey ||  || align=right | 3.3 km || 
|-id=582 bgcolor=#d6d6d6
| 608582 ||  || — || January 15, 2005 || Kitt Peak || Spacewatch ||  || align=right | 2.7 km || 
|-id=583 bgcolor=#d6d6d6
| 608583 ||  || — || April 27, 2012 || Haleakala || Pan-STARRS ||  || align=right | 2.7 km || 
|-id=584 bgcolor=#d6d6d6
| 608584 ||  || — || September 28, 1997 || Kitt Peak || Spacewatch ||  || align=right | 2.9 km || 
|-id=585 bgcolor=#E9E9E9
| 608585 ||  || — || October 19, 2012 || Haleakala || Pan-STARRS ||  || align=right | 1.3 km || 
|-id=586 bgcolor=#fefefe
| 608586 ||  || — || April 1, 2012 || Mount Lemmon || Mount Lemmon Survey ||  || align=right data-sort-value="0.61" | 610 m || 
|-id=587 bgcolor=#fefefe
| 608587 ||  || — || October 23, 2003 || Kitt Peak || Spacewatch ||  || align=right data-sort-value="0.56" | 560 m || 
|-id=588 bgcolor=#E9E9E9
| 608588 ||  || — || May 21, 2015 || Haleakala || Pan-STARRS ||  || align=right | 1.1 km || 
|-id=589 bgcolor=#fefefe
| 608589 ||  || — || April 2, 2009 || Mount Lemmon || Mount Lemmon Survey ||  || align=right data-sort-value="0.74" | 740 m || 
|-id=590 bgcolor=#E9E9E9
| 608590 ||  || — || August 10, 2007 || Kitt Peak || Spacewatch ||  || align=right | 1.4 km || 
|-id=591 bgcolor=#d6d6d6
| 608591 ||  || — || February 5, 2011 || Catalina || CSS ||  || align=right | 2.7 km || 
|-id=592 bgcolor=#d6d6d6
| 608592 ||  || — || December 13, 2010 || Mount Lemmon || Mount Lemmon Survey ||  || align=right | 3.0 km || 
|-id=593 bgcolor=#d6d6d6
| 608593 ||  || — || November 19, 2009 || Kitt Peak || Spacewatch ||  || align=right | 3.2 km || 
|-id=594 bgcolor=#fefefe
| 608594 ||  || — || December 10, 2014 || Mount Lemmon || Mount Lemmon Survey ||  || align=right data-sort-value="0.66" | 660 m || 
|-id=595 bgcolor=#E9E9E9
| 608595 ||  || — || October 22, 2003 || Junk Bond || D. Healy ||  || align=right | 1.4 km || 
|-id=596 bgcolor=#E9E9E9
| 608596 ||  || — || October 29, 2003 || Kitt Peak || Spacewatch ||  || align=right | 1.4 km || 
|-id=597 bgcolor=#d6d6d6
| 608597 ||  || — || March 3, 2006 || Catalina || CSS ||  || align=right | 3.1 km || 
|-id=598 bgcolor=#fefefe
| 608598 ||  || — || February 27, 2012 || Haleakala || Pan-STARRS ||  || align=right data-sort-value="0.61" | 610 m || 
|-id=599 bgcolor=#d6d6d6
| 608599 ||  || — || August 30, 2014 || Haleakala || Pan-STARRS ||  || align=right | 2.5 km || 
|-id=600 bgcolor=#fefefe
| 608600 ||  || — || October 17, 2003 || Kitt Peak || Spacewatch ||  || align=right data-sort-value="0.72" | 720 m || 
|}

608601–608700 

|-bgcolor=#E9E9E9
| 608601 ||  || — || October 25, 2003 || Kitt Peak || Spacewatch ||  || align=right | 2.0 km || 
|-id=602 bgcolor=#fefefe
| 608602 ||  || — || June 7, 2013 || Haleakala || Pan-STARRS ||  || align=right data-sort-value="0.70" | 700 m || 
|-id=603 bgcolor=#E9E9E9
| 608603 ||  || — || October 20, 2003 || Kitt Peak || Spacewatch ||  || align=right | 1.2 km || 
|-id=604 bgcolor=#E9E9E9
| 608604 ||  || — || October 20, 2003 || Kitt Peak || Spacewatch ||  || align=right | 1.8 km || 
|-id=605 bgcolor=#fefefe
| 608605 ||  || — || October 23, 2003 || Kitt Peak || Spacewatch ||  || align=right data-sort-value="0.47" | 470 m || 
|-id=606 bgcolor=#d6d6d6
| 608606 ||  || — || November 8, 2009 || Kitt Peak || Spacewatch ||  || align=right | 2.8 km || 
|-id=607 bgcolor=#d6d6d6
| 608607 ||  || — || November 16, 2009 || Mount Lemmon || Mount Lemmon Survey ||  || align=right | 2.5 km || 
|-id=608 bgcolor=#E9E9E9
| 608608 ||  || — || November 6, 2012 || Mount Lemmon || Mount Lemmon Survey ||  || align=right | 1.7 km || 
|-id=609 bgcolor=#E9E9E9
| 608609 ||  || — || November 16, 2003 || Kitt Peak || Spacewatch ||  || align=right | 1.3 km || 
|-id=610 bgcolor=#d6d6d6
| 608610 ||  || — || June 1, 2014 || Haleakala || Pan-STARRS ||  || align=right | 2.8 km || 
|-id=611 bgcolor=#fefefe
| 608611 ||  || — || October 20, 2003 || Kitt Peak || Spacewatch ||  || align=right data-sort-value="0.61" | 610 m || 
|-id=612 bgcolor=#d6d6d6
| 608612 ||  || — || October 4, 2003 || Kitt Peak || Spacewatch ||  || align=right | 3.0 km || 
|-id=613 bgcolor=#E9E9E9
| 608613 ||  || — || November 20, 2016 || Mount Lemmon || Mount Lemmon Survey ||  || align=right | 1.6 km || 
|-id=614 bgcolor=#d6d6d6
| 608614 ||  || — || November 6, 2015 || Haleakala || Pan-STARRS ||  || align=right | 2.5 km || 
|-id=615 bgcolor=#d6d6d6
| 608615 ||  || — || March 24, 2006 || Mount Lemmon || Mount Lemmon Survey ||  || align=right | 2.7 km || 
|-id=616 bgcolor=#fefefe
| 608616 ||  || — || November 26, 2017 || Mount Lemmon || Mount Lemmon Survey ||  || align=right data-sort-value="0.61" | 610 m || 
|-id=617 bgcolor=#fefefe
| 608617 ||  || — || October 12, 2010 || Mount Lemmon || Mount Lemmon Survey ||  || align=right data-sort-value="0.58" | 580 m || 
|-id=618 bgcolor=#fefefe
| 608618 ||  || — || January 29, 2012 || Kitt Peak || Spacewatch ||  || align=right data-sort-value="0.69" | 690 m || 
|-id=619 bgcolor=#d6d6d6
| 608619 ||  || — || January 23, 2006 || Mount Lemmon || Mount Lemmon Survey ||  || align=right | 2.1 km || 
|-id=620 bgcolor=#E9E9E9
| 608620 ||  || — || May 10, 2011 || Mount Lemmon || Mount Lemmon Survey ||  || align=right | 1.3 km || 
|-id=621 bgcolor=#E9E9E9
| 608621 ||  || — || October 19, 2003 || Kitt Peak || Spacewatch ||  || align=right | 1.3 km || 
|-id=622 bgcolor=#E9E9E9
| 608622 ||  || — || September 27, 2016 || Haleakala || Pan-STARRS ||  || align=right | 1.1 km || 
|-id=623 bgcolor=#fefefe
| 608623 ||  || — || March 16, 2012 || Haleakala || Pan-STARRS ||  || align=right data-sort-value="0.57" | 570 m || 
|-id=624 bgcolor=#d6d6d6
| 608624 ||  || — || January 12, 2011 || Kitt Peak || Spacewatch ||  || align=right | 2.2 km || 
|-id=625 bgcolor=#fefefe
| 608625 ||  || — || January 13, 2015 || Haleakala || Pan-STARRS ||  || align=right data-sort-value="0.68" | 680 m || 
|-id=626 bgcolor=#d6d6d6
| 608626 ||  || — || October 1, 2014 || Haleakala || Pan-STARRS ||  || align=right | 2.4 km || 
|-id=627 bgcolor=#d6d6d6
| 608627 ||  || — || September 3, 2008 || Kitt Peak || Spacewatch ||  || align=right | 2.4 km || 
|-id=628 bgcolor=#d6d6d6
| 608628 ||  || — || October 1, 2014 || Haleakala || Pan-STARRS ||  || align=right | 2.2 km || 
|-id=629 bgcolor=#E9E9E9
| 608629 ||  || — || September 12, 2016 || Haleakala || Pan-STARRS ||  || align=right | 1.1 km || 
|-id=630 bgcolor=#E9E9E9
| 608630 ||  || — || October 22, 2003 || Kitt Peak || Spacewatch ||  || align=right | 1.2 km || 
|-id=631 bgcolor=#fefefe
| 608631 ||  || — || October 11, 2010 || Catalina || CSS ||  || align=right data-sort-value="0.67" | 670 m || 
|-id=632 bgcolor=#E9E9E9
| 608632 ||  || — || January 1, 2009 || Kitt Peak || Spacewatch ||  || align=right | 1.2 km || 
|-id=633 bgcolor=#E9E9E9
| 608633 ||  || — || October 25, 2003 || Socorro || LINEAR ||  || align=right | 1.4 km || 
|-id=634 bgcolor=#E9E9E9
| 608634 ||  || — || November 16, 2003 || Kitt Peak || Spacewatch ||  || align=right | 1.0 km || 
|-id=635 bgcolor=#E9E9E9
| 608635 ||  || — || November 19, 2003 || Socorro || LINEAR ||  || align=right | 1.5 km || 
|-id=636 bgcolor=#E9E9E9
| 608636 ||  || — || November 14, 2003 || Palomar || NEAT ||  || align=right | 2.5 km || 
|-id=637 bgcolor=#E9E9E9
| 608637 ||  || — || November 21, 2003 || Nogales || P. R. Holvorcem, M. Schwartz ||  || align=right | 2.1 km || 
|-id=638 bgcolor=#fefefe
| 608638 ||  || — || November 18, 2003 || Kitt Peak || Spacewatch ||  || align=right data-sort-value="0.65" | 650 m || 
|-id=639 bgcolor=#E9E9E9
| 608639 ||  || — || October 19, 2003 || Palomar || NEAT || HNS || align=right | 1.6 km || 
|-id=640 bgcolor=#E9E9E9
| 608640 ||  || — || November 20, 2003 || Socorro || LINEAR ||  || align=right | 1.8 km || 
|-id=641 bgcolor=#E9E9E9
| 608641 ||  || — || October 19, 2003 || Palomar || NEAT || JUN || align=right data-sort-value="0.99" | 990 m || 
|-id=642 bgcolor=#E9E9E9
| 608642 ||  || — || October 25, 2003 || Kitt Peak || Spacewatch ||  || align=right | 1.3 km || 
|-id=643 bgcolor=#fefefe
| 608643 ||  || — || December 6, 1996 || Kitt Peak || Spacewatch ||  || align=right data-sort-value="0.74" | 740 m || 
|-id=644 bgcolor=#E9E9E9
| 608644 ||  || — || October 20, 2003 || Kitt Peak || Spacewatch ||  || align=right | 1.4 km || 
|-id=645 bgcolor=#E9E9E9
| 608645 ||  || — || November 20, 2003 || Kitt Peak || Spacewatch ||  || align=right | 2.0 km || 
|-id=646 bgcolor=#d6d6d6
| 608646 ||  || — || November 20, 2003 || Kitt Peak || Spacewatch ||  || align=right | 2.8 km || 
|-id=647 bgcolor=#E9E9E9
| 608647 ||  || — || November 21, 2003 || Socorro || LINEAR ||  || align=right | 1.0 km || 
|-id=648 bgcolor=#fefefe
| 608648 ||  || — || September 29, 2003 || Anderson Mesa || LONEOS ||  || align=right data-sort-value="0.85" | 850 m || 
|-id=649 bgcolor=#E9E9E9
| 608649 ||  || — || November 30, 2003 || Kitt Peak || Spacewatch ||  || align=right | 1.1 km || 
|-id=650 bgcolor=#E9E9E9
| 608650 ||  || — || November 30, 2003 || Kitt Peak || Spacewatch ||  || align=right | 1.6 km || 
|-id=651 bgcolor=#d6d6d6
| 608651 ||  || — || November 30, 2003 || Kitt Peak || Spacewatch ||  || align=right | 2.5 km || 
|-id=652 bgcolor=#fefefe
| 608652 ||  || — || October 25, 2003 || Kitt Peak || Spacewatch ||  || align=right data-sort-value="0.44" | 440 m || 
|-id=653 bgcolor=#d6d6d6
| 608653 ||  || — || November 20, 2003 || Kitt Peak || Kitt Peak Obs. ||  || align=right | 2.1 km || 
|-id=654 bgcolor=#E9E9E9
| 608654 ||  || — || November 23, 2003 || Kitt Peak || Kitt Peak Obs. ||  || align=right | 1.0 km || 
|-id=655 bgcolor=#d6d6d6
| 608655 ||  || — || November 23, 2003 || Kitt Peak || Kitt Peak Obs. ||  || align=right | 2.5 km || 
|-id=656 bgcolor=#fefefe
| 608656 ||  || — || March 8, 2005 || Mount Lemmon || Mount Lemmon Survey ||  || align=right data-sort-value="0.76" | 760 m || 
|-id=657 bgcolor=#fefefe
| 608657 ||  || — || June 3, 2009 || Mount Lemmon || Mount Lemmon Survey ||  || align=right data-sort-value="0.75" | 750 m || 
|-id=658 bgcolor=#fefefe
| 608658 ||  || — || January 18, 2008 || Mount Lemmon || Mount Lemmon Survey ||  || align=right data-sort-value="0.80" | 800 m || 
|-id=659 bgcolor=#fefefe
| 608659 ||  || — || October 28, 2010 || Kitt Peak || Spacewatch ||  || align=right data-sort-value="0.87" | 870 m || 
|-id=660 bgcolor=#fefefe
| 608660 ||  || — || November 30, 2003 || Kitt Peak || Spacewatch ||  || align=right | 1.00 km || 
|-id=661 bgcolor=#fefefe
| 608661 ||  || — || April 1, 2005 || Kitt Peak || Spacewatch ||  || align=right data-sort-value="0.81" | 810 m || 
|-id=662 bgcolor=#E9E9E9
| 608662 ||  || — || December 4, 2008 || Mount Lemmon || Mount Lemmon Survey ||  || align=right | 1.4 km || 
|-id=663 bgcolor=#E9E9E9
| 608663 ||  || — || March 18, 2010 || Kitt Peak || Spacewatch ||  || align=right | 1.8 km || 
|-id=664 bgcolor=#d6d6d6
| 608664 ||  || — || November 9, 2009 || Kitt Peak || Spacewatch ||  || align=right | 3.3 km || 
|-id=665 bgcolor=#fefefe
| 608665 ||  || — || January 21, 2012 || Kitt Peak || Spacewatch ||  || align=right data-sort-value="0.75" | 750 m || 
|-id=666 bgcolor=#E9E9E9
| 608666 ||  || — || July 17, 2016 || Haleakala || Pan-STARRS ||  || align=right | 1.6 km || 
|-id=667 bgcolor=#fefefe
| 608667 ||  || — || June 8, 2013 || Mount Lemmon || Mount Lemmon Survey ||  || align=right data-sort-value="0.69" | 690 m || 
|-id=668 bgcolor=#fefefe
| 608668 ||  || — || March 4, 2008 || Mount Lemmon || Mount Lemmon Survey ||  || align=right data-sort-value="0.68" | 680 m || 
|-id=669 bgcolor=#fefefe
| 608669 ||  || — || December 1, 2003 || Kitt Peak || Spacewatch ||  || align=right data-sort-value="0.50" | 500 m || 
|-id=670 bgcolor=#E9E9E9
| 608670 ||  || — || October 22, 2012 || Kitt Peak || Spacewatch ||  || align=right | 1.7 km || 
|-id=671 bgcolor=#d6d6d6
| 608671 ||  || — || August 16, 2014 || Haleakala || Pan-STARRS ||  || align=right | 3.5 km || 
|-id=672 bgcolor=#d6d6d6
| 608672 ||  || — || February 25, 2011 || Mount Lemmon || Mount Lemmon Survey ||  || align=right | 2.2 km || 
|-id=673 bgcolor=#fefefe
| 608673 ||  || — || December 19, 2007 || Mount Lemmon || Mount Lemmon Survey ||  || align=right data-sort-value="0.81" | 810 m || 
|-id=674 bgcolor=#d6d6d6
| 608674 ||  || — || September 17, 2014 || Charleston || R. Holmes ||  || align=right | 2.9 km || 
|-id=675 bgcolor=#E9E9E9
| 608675 ||  || — || November 30, 2003 || Kitt Peak || Spacewatch ||  || align=right | 1.9 km || 
|-id=676 bgcolor=#fefefe
| 608676 ||  || — || September 17, 2010 || Mount Lemmon || Mount Lemmon Survey ||  || align=right data-sort-value="0.46" | 460 m || 
|-id=677 bgcolor=#E9E9E9
| 608677 ||  || — || August 30, 2011 || Haleakala || Pan-STARRS ||  || align=right | 1.3 km || 
|-id=678 bgcolor=#fefefe
| 608678 ||  || — || November 26, 2003 || Kitt Peak || Spacewatch ||  || align=right data-sort-value="0.53" | 530 m || 
|-id=679 bgcolor=#d6d6d6
| 608679 ||  || — || January 13, 2005 || Kitt Peak || Spacewatch ||  || align=right | 3.0 km || 
|-id=680 bgcolor=#E9E9E9
| 608680 ||  || — || November 19, 2003 || Kitt Peak || Spacewatch ||  || align=right | 1.2 km || 
|-id=681 bgcolor=#fefefe
| 608681 ||  || — || March 1, 2012 || Kitt Peak || Spacewatch ||  || align=right data-sort-value="0.62" | 620 m || 
|-id=682 bgcolor=#d6d6d6
| 608682 ||  || — || August 29, 2014 || Mount Lemmon || Mount Lemmon Survey ||  || align=right | 2.9 km || 
|-id=683 bgcolor=#d6d6d6
| 608683 ||  || — || July 13, 2013 || Haleakala || Pan-STARRS ||  || align=right | 2.8 km || 
|-id=684 bgcolor=#E9E9E9
| 608684 ||  || — || November 30, 2003 || Kitt Peak || Spacewatch ||  || align=right | 1.5 km || 
|-id=685 bgcolor=#fefefe
| 608685 ||  || — || October 24, 2003 || Kitt Peak || Spacewatch ||  || align=right data-sort-value="0.60" | 600 m || 
|-id=686 bgcolor=#E9E9E9
| 608686 ||  || — || November 26, 2003 || Kitt Peak || Spacewatch ||  || align=right | 1.1 km || 
|-id=687 bgcolor=#E9E9E9
| 608687 ||  || — || October 20, 2007 || Kitt Peak || Spacewatch ||  || align=right | 1.8 km || 
|-id=688 bgcolor=#E9E9E9
| 608688 ||  || — || September 25, 2016 || Haleakala || Pan-STARRS ||  || align=right | 2.1 km || 
|-id=689 bgcolor=#fefefe
| 608689 ||  || — || September 25, 2006 || Mount Lemmon || Mount Lemmon Survey ||  || align=right data-sort-value="0.67" | 670 m || 
|-id=690 bgcolor=#fefefe
| 608690 ||  || — || March 8, 2005 || Kitt Peak || Spacewatch ||  || align=right data-sort-value="0.74" | 740 m || 
|-id=691 bgcolor=#E9E9E9
| 608691 ||  || — || January 16, 2009 || Mount Lemmon || Mount Lemmon Survey ||  || align=right | 1.5 km || 
|-id=692 bgcolor=#E9E9E9
| 608692 ||  || — || November 14, 2012 || Mauna Kea || M. Micheli, A. Draginda ||  || align=right | 1.8 km || 
|-id=693 bgcolor=#E9E9E9
| 608693 ||  || — || November 18, 2003 || Kitt Peak || Spacewatch ||  || align=right | 1.6 km || 
|-id=694 bgcolor=#fefefe
| 608694 ||  || — || February 27, 2012 || Haleakala || Pan-STARRS ||  || align=right data-sort-value="0.79" | 790 m || 
|-id=695 bgcolor=#E9E9E9
| 608695 ||  || — || December 10, 2012 || Kitt Peak || Spacewatch ||  || align=right | 1.0 km || 
|-id=696 bgcolor=#E9E9E9
| 608696 ||  || — || March 13, 2005 || Kitt Peak || Spacewatch ||  || align=right | 1.9 km || 
|-id=697 bgcolor=#d6d6d6
| 608697 ||  || — || September 28, 2008 || Mount Lemmon || Mount Lemmon Survey ||  || align=right | 2.5 km || 
|-id=698 bgcolor=#d6d6d6
| 608698 ||  || — || November 20, 2003 || Kitt Peak || Spacewatch ||  || align=right | 2.4 km || 
|-id=699 bgcolor=#d6d6d6
| 608699 ||  || — || November 30, 2003 || Kitt Peak || Spacewatch ||  || align=right | 2.5 km || 
|-id=700 bgcolor=#d6d6d6
| 608700 ||  || — || September 7, 2008 || Mount Lemmon || Mount Lemmon Survey ||  || align=right | 2.4 km || 
|}

608701–608800 

|-bgcolor=#E9E9E9
| 608701 ||  || — || November 26, 2003 || Kitt Peak || Spacewatch ||  || align=right | 1.3 km || 
|-id=702 bgcolor=#E9E9E9
| 608702 ||  || — || September 19, 2007 || Kitt Peak || Spacewatch ||  || align=right | 1.6 km || 
|-id=703 bgcolor=#E9E9E9
| 608703 ||  || — || February 26, 2014 || Mount Lemmon || Mount Lemmon Survey ||  || align=right | 1.5 km || 
|-id=704 bgcolor=#d6d6d6
| 608704 ||  || — || November 20, 2003 || Kitt Peak || Spacewatch ||  || align=right | 2.8 km || 
|-id=705 bgcolor=#fefefe
| 608705 ||  || — || November 19, 2003 || Kitt Peak || Spacewatch ||  || align=right data-sort-value="0.50" | 500 m || 
|-id=706 bgcolor=#fefefe
| 608706 ||  || — || May 3, 2016 || Mount Lemmon || Mount Lemmon Survey ||  || align=right data-sort-value="0.54" | 540 m || 
|-id=707 bgcolor=#E9E9E9
| 608707 ||  || — || August 28, 2016 || Mount Lemmon || Mount Lemmon Survey ||  || align=right | 1.7 km || 
|-id=708 bgcolor=#d6d6d6
| 608708 ||  || — || November 16, 2003 || Kitt Peak || Spacewatch ||  || align=right | 2.5 km || 
|-id=709 bgcolor=#d6d6d6
| 608709 ||  || — || November 20, 2003 || Kitt Peak || Spacewatch ||  || align=right | 3.3 km || 
|-id=710 bgcolor=#d6d6d6
| 608710 ||  || — || September 19, 2014 || Haleakala || Pan-STARRS ||  || align=right | 2.1 km || 
|-id=711 bgcolor=#fefefe
| 608711 ||  || — || May 16, 2013 || Haleakala || Pan-STARRS ||  || align=right data-sort-value="0.52" | 520 m || 
|-id=712 bgcolor=#d6d6d6
| 608712 ||  || — || November 19, 2003 || Kitt Peak || Spacewatch ||  || align=right | 2.4 km || 
|-id=713 bgcolor=#E9E9E9
| 608713 ||  || — || December 1, 2003 || Kitt Peak || Spacewatch ||  || align=right | 1.8 km || 
|-id=714 bgcolor=#E9E9E9
| 608714 ||  || — || November 20, 2003 || Kitt Peak || Spacewatch ||  || align=right | 2.5 km || 
|-id=715 bgcolor=#E9E9E9
| 608715 ||  || — || November 20, 2003 || Kitt Peak || Spacewatch ||  || align=right | 1.7 km || 
|-id=716 bgcolor=#fefefe
| 608716 ||  || — || December 1, 2003 || Kitt Peak || Spacewatch ||  || align=right data-sort-value="0.64" | 640 m || 
|-id=717 bgcolor=#E9E9E9
| 608717 ||  || — || December 1, 2003 || Kitt Peak || Spacewatch ||  || align=right | 1.2 km || 
|-id=718 bgcolor=#E9E9E9
| 608718 ||  || — || December 22, 2012 || Haleakala || Pan-STARRS ||  || align=right | 1.4 km || 
|-id=719 bgcolor=#E9E9E9
| 608719 ||  || — || May 27, 2014 || Mount Lemmon || Mount Lemmon Survey ||  || align=right | 1.5 km || 
|-id=720 bgcolor=#d6d6d6
| 608720 ||  || — || February 5, 2011 || Haleakala || Pan-STARRS ||  || align=right | 2.4 km || 
|-id=721 bgcolor=#E9E9E9
| 608721 ||  || — || October 22, 2016 || Mount Lemmon || Mount Lemmon Survey ||  || align=right | 1.5 km || 
|-id=722 bgcolor=#d6d6d6
| 608722 ||  || — || December 10, 2009 || Mount Lemmon || Mount Lemmon Survey ||  || align=right | 2.5 km || 
|-id=723 bgcolor=#fefefe
| 608723 ||  || — || December 17, 2003 || Socorro || LINEAR || H || align=right data-sort-value="0.59" | 590 m || 
|-id=724 bgcolor=#fefefe
| 608724 ||  || — || December 18, 2003 || Socorro || LINEAR ||  || align=right | 1.2 km || 
|-id=725 bgcolor=#fefefe
| 608725 ||  || — || December 19, 2003 || Socorro || LINEAR || H || align=right data-sort-value="0.70" | 700 m || 
|-id=726 bgcolor=#fefefe
| 608726 ||  || — || March 26, 2001 || Kitt Peak || M. W. Buie, S. D. Kern || NYS || align=right data-sort-value="0.82" | 820 m || 
|-id=727 bgcolor=#E9E9E9
| 608727 ||  || — || December 19, 2003 || Kitt Peak || Spacewatch ||  || align=right | 1.6 km || 
|-id=728 bgcolor=#E9E9E9
| 608728 ||  || — || December 19, 2003 || Kitt Peak || Spacewatch ||  || align=right | 1.5 km || 
|-id=729 bgcolor=#E9E9E9
| 608729 ||  || — || December 18, 2003 || Socorro || LINEAR ||  || align=right | 2.5 km || 
|-id=730 bgcolor=#E9E9E9
| 608730 ||  || — || December 16, 2003 || Kitt Peak || Spacewatch ||  || align=right | 1.3 km || 
|-id=731 bgcolor=#E9E9E9
| 608731 ||  || — || December 27, 2003 || Socorro || LINEAR ||  || align=right | 1.8 km || 
|-id=732 bgcolor=#E9E9E9
| 608732 ||  || — || December 28, 2003 || Kitt Peak || Spacewatch ||  || align=right | 2.1 km || 
|-id=733 bgcolor=#E9E9E9
| 608733 ||  || — || December 28, 2003 || Kitt Peak || Spacewatch ||  || align=right | 2.2 km || 
|-id=734 bgcolor=#E9E9E9
| 608734 ||  || — || December 29, 2003 || Socorro || LINEAR ||  || align=right | 2.1 km || 
|-id=735 bgcolor=#E9E9E9
| 608735 ||  || — || November 20, 2003 || Kitt Peak || Spacewatch ||  || align=right | 1.9 km || 
|-id=736 bgcolor=#d6d6d6
| 608736 ||  || — || December 17, 2003 || Kitt Peak || Spacewatch ||  || align=right | 3.1 km || 
|-id=737 bgcolor=#E9E9E9
| 608737 ||  || — || December 18, 2003 || Kitt Peak || Spacewatch ||  || align=right | 2.3 km || 
|-id=738 bgcolor=#fefefe
| 608738 ||  || — || December 18, 2003 || Kitt Peak || Spacewatch ||  || align=right data-sort-value="0.68" | 680 m || 
|-id=739 bgcolor=#d6d6d6
| 608739 ||  || — || November 24, 2003 || Kitt Peak || Spacewatch ||  || align=right | 3.1 km || 
|-id=740 bgcolor=#fefefe
| 608740 ||  || — || December 13, 2010 || Mount Lemmon || Mount Lemmon Survey ||  || align=right data-sort-value="0.90" | 900 m || 
|-id=741 bgcolor=#fefefe
| 608741 ||  || — || December 22, 2003 || Kitt Peak || Spacewatch ||  || align=right data-sort-value="0.87" | 870 m || 
|-id=742 bgcolor=#fefefe
| 608742 ||  || — || December 18, 2003 || Kitt Peak || Spacewatch ||  || align=right data-sort-value="0.70" | 700 m || 
|-id=743 bgcolor=#fefefe
| 608743 ||  || — || March 13, 2008 || Mauna Kea || F. Bernardi, M. Micheli ||  || align=right data-sort-value="0.55" | 550 m || 
|-id=744 bgcolor=#E9E9E9
| 608744 ||  || — || April 7, 2014 || Mount Lemmon || Mount Lemmon Survey ||  || align=right | 1.9 km || 
|-id=745 bgcolor=#fefefe
| 608745 ||  || — || February 13, 2008 || Mount Lemmon || Mount Lemmon Survey ||  || align=right data-sort-value="0.72" | 720 m || 
|-id=746 bgcolor=#E9E9E9
| 608746 ||  || — || December 6, 2012 || Nogales || M. Schwartz, P. R. Holvorcem ||  || align=right | 1.9 km || 
|-id=747 bgcolor=#E9E9E9
| 608747 ||  || — || April 5, 2014 || Haleakala || Pan-STARRS ||  || align=right | 2.2 km || 
|-id=748 bgcolor=#E9E9E9
| 608748 ||  || — || January 1, 2009 || Kitt Peak || Spacewatch ||  || align=right | 1.7 km || 
|-id=749 bgcolor=#fefefe
| 608749 ||  || — || January 13, 2008 || Kitt Peak || Spacewatch ||  || align=right data-sort-value="0.69" | 690 m || 
|-id=750 bgcolor=#E9E9E9
| 608750 ||  || — || April 4, 2014 || Haleakala || Pan-STARRS ||  || align=right | 1.8 km || 
|-id=751 bgcolor=#E9E9E9
| 608751 ||  || — || October 15, 2007 || Mount Lemmon || Mount Lemmon Survey ||  || align=right | 2.0 km || 
|-id=752 bgcolor=#E9E9E9
| 608752 ||  || — || October 9, 2007 || Mount Lemmon || Mount Lemmon Survey ||  || align=right | 1.4 km || 
|-id=753 bgcolor=#fefefe
| 608753 ||  || — || March 27, 2012 || Kitt Peak || Spacewatch ||  || align=right data-sort-value="0.63" | 630 m || 
|-id=754 bgcolor=#fefefe
| 608754 ||  || — || December 22, 2003 || Kitt Peak || Spacewatch ||  || align=right data-sort-value="0.50" | 500 m || 
|-id=755 bgcolor=#d6d6d6
| 608755 ||  || — || October 10, 2008 || Mount Lemmon || Mount Lemmon Survey ||  || align=right | 2.4 km || 
|-id=756 bgcolor=#E9E9E9
| 608756 ||  || — || January 13, 2004 || Anderson Mesa || LONEOS ||  || align=right | 1.7 km || 
|-id=757 bgcolor=#fefefe
| 608757 ||  || — || January 13, 2004 || Palomar || NEAT || H || align=right data-sort-value="0.76" | 760 m || 
|-id=758 bgcolor=#E9E9E9
| 608758 ||  || — || January 15, 2004 || Kitt Peak || Spacewatch ||  || align=right | 2.0 km || 
|-id=759 bgcolor=#E9E9E9
| 608759 ||  || — || January 15, 2004 || Kitt Peak || Spacewatch ||  || align=right | 1.7 km || 
|-id=760 bgcolor=#fefefe
| 608760 ||  || — || January 15, 2004 || Kitt Peak || Spacewatch ||  || align=right data-sort-value="0.55" | 550 m || 
|-id=761 bgcolor=#d6d6d6
| 608761 ||  || — || September 19, 2014 || Haleakala || Pan-STARRS ||  || align=right | 2.4 km || 
|-id=762 bgcolor=#FA8072
| 608762 ||  || — || January 16, 2004 || Palomar || NEAT || H || align=right data-sort-value="0.63" | 630 m || 
|-id=763 bgcolor=#fefefe
| 608763 ||  || — || January 16, 2004 || Palomar || NEAT || H || align=right data-sort-value="0.74" | 740 m || 
|-id=764 bgcolor=#fefefe
| 608764 ||  || — || January 16, 2004 || Palomar || NEAT ||  || align=right data-sort-value="0.83" | 830 m || 
|-id=765 bgcolor=#d6d6d6
| 608765 ||  || — || January 18, 2004 || Needville || J. Dellinger ||  || align=right | 3.2 km || 
|-id=766 bgcolor=#E9E9E9
| 608766 ||  || — || January 21, 2004 || Socorro || LINEAR ||  || align=right | 2.2 km || 
|-id=767 bgcolor=#E9E9E9
| 608767 ||  || — || June 28, 2001 || Kitt Peak || Spacewatch ||  || align=right | 2.8 km || 
|-id=768 bgcolor=#E9E9E9
| 608768 ||  || — || January 16, 2004 || Kitt Peak || Spacewatch ||  || align=right | 2.2 km || 
|-id=769 bgcolor=#fefefe
| 608769 ||  || — || January 16, 2004 || Palomar || NEAT || H || align=right data-sort-value="0.59" | 590 m || 
|-id=770 bgcolor=#fefefe
| 608770 ||  || — || January 22, 2004 || Socorro || LINEAR || H || align=right data-sort-value="0.59" | 590 m || 
|-id=771 bgcolor=#fefefe
| 608771 ||  || — || January 27, 2004 || Kitt Peak || Spacewatch ||  || align=right data-sort-value="0.55" | 550 m || 
|-id=772 bgcolor=#FA8072
| 608772 ||  || — || December 28, 2003 || Anderson Mesa || LONEOS ||  || align=right | 1.2 km || 
|-id=773 bgcolor=#E9E9E9
| 608773 ||  || — || January 16, 2004 || Kitt Peak || Spacewatch ||  || align=right | 1.3 km || 
|-id=774 bgcolor=#E9E9E9
| 608774 ||  || — || January 16, 2004 || Kitt Peak || Spacewatch ||  || align=right | 1.9 km || 
|-id=775 bgcolor=#E9E9E9
| 608775 ||  || — || January 18, 2004 || Kitt Peak || Spacewatch ||  || align=right | 1.7 km || 
|-id=776 bgcolor=#E9E9E9
| 608776 ||  || — || January 19, 2004 || Kitt Peak || Spacewatch ||  || align=right | 1.5 km || 
|-id=777 bgcolor=#fefefe
| 608777 ||  || — || January 19, 2004 || Kitt Peak || Spacewatch ||  || align=right data-sort-value="0.49" | 490 m || 
|-id=778 bgcolor=#E9E9E9
| 608778 ||  || — || January 19, 2004 || Kitt Peak || Spacewatch ||  || align=right | 1.6 km || 
|-id=779 bgcolor=#E9E9E9
| 608779 ||  || — || January 19, 2004 || Kitt Peak || Spacewatch ||  || align=right | 1.7 km || 
|-id=780 bgcolor=#E9E9E9
| 608780 ||  || — || January 19, 2004 || Kitt Peak || Spacewatch ||  || align=right | 2.2 km || 
|-id=781 bgcolor=#fefefe
| 608781 ||  || — || January 19, 2004 || Kitt Peak || Spacewatch ||  || align=right data-sort-value="0.57" | 570 m || 
|-id=782 bgcolor=#E9E9E9
| 608782 ||  || — || January 28, 2004 || Kitt Peak || Spacewatch ||  || align=right | 2.1 km || 
|-id=783 bgcolor=#E9E9E9
| 608783 ||  || — || January 17, 2004 || Palomar || NEAT ||  || align=right | 1.8 km || 
|-id=784 bgcolor=#fefefe
| 608784 ||  || — || November 15, 2010 || Kitt Peak || Spacewatch ||  || align=right data-sort-value="0.84" | 840 m || 
|-id=785 bgcolor=#fefefe
| 608785 ||  || — || February 11, 2008 || Mount Lemmon || Mount Lemmon Survey ||  || align=right data-sort-value="0.63" | 630 m || 
|-id=786 bgcolor=#E9E9E9
| 608786 ||  || — || February 10, 2014 || Haleakala || Pan-STARRS ||  || align=right | 2.3 km || 
|-id=787 bgcolor=#E9E9E9
| 608787 ||  || — || March 3, 2009 || Kitt Peak || Spacewatch ||  || align=right | 1.7 km || 
|-id=788 bgcolor=#E9E9E9
| 608788 ||  || — || October 28, 2016 || Haleakala || Pan-STARRS ||  || align=right | 2.2 km || 
|-id=789 bgcolor=#E9E9E9
| 608789 ||  || — || April 30, 2014 || Haleakala || Pan-STARRS ||  || align=right | 1.9 km || 
|-id=790 bgcolor=#E9E9E9
| 608790 ||  || — || November 2, 2007 || Kitt Peak || Spacewatch ||  || align=right | 1.8 km || 
|-id=791 bgcolor=#E9E9E9
| 608791 ||  || — || November 9, 2007 || Kitt Peak || Spacewatch ||  || align=right | 1.6 km || 
|-id=792 bgcolor=#E9E9E9
| 608792 ||  || — || January 9, 2013 || Kitt Peak || Spacewatch ||  || align=right | 1.7 km || 
|-id=793 bgcolor=#E9E9E9
| 608793 ||  || — || January 30, 2004 || Kitt Peak || Spacewatch ||  || align=right | 1.7 km || 
|-id=794 bgcolor=#E9E9E9
| 608794 ||  || — || September 9, 2007 || Mount Lemmon || Mount Lemmon Survey ||  || align=right | 1.7 km || 
|-id=795 bgcolor=#E9E9E9
| 608795 ||  || — || July 28, 2011 || Haleakala || Pan-STARRS ||  || align=right | 2.0 km || 
|-id=796 bgcolor=#fefefe
| 608796 ||  || — || September 18, 2006 || Kitt Peak || Spacewatch ||  || align=right data-sort-value="0.53" | 530 m || 
|-id=797 bgcolor=#fefefe
| 608797 ||  || — || November 25, 2013 || Haleakala || Pan-STARRS || H || align=right data-sort-value="0.58" | 580 m || 
|-id=798 bgcolor=#E9E9E9
| 608798 ||  || — || September 18, 2011 || Mount Lemmon || Mount Lemmon Survey ||  || align=right | 1.7 km || 
|-id=799 bgcolor=#E9E9E9
| 608799 ||  || — || January 28, 2004 || Kitt Peak || Spacewatch ||  || align=right | 2.0 km || 
|-id=800 bgcolor=#fefefe
| 608800 ||  || — || April 8, 2008 || Kitt Peak || Spacewatch ||  || align=right data-sort-value="0.48" | 480 m || 
|}

608801–608900 

|-bgcolor=#E9E9E9
| 608801 ||  || — || May 23, 2014 || Mount Lemmon || Mount Lemmon Survey ||  || align=right | 1.7 km || 
|-id=802 bgcolor=#E9E9E9
| 608802 ||  || — || August 1, 2015 || Haleakala || Pan-STARRS ||  || align=right | 1.8 km || 
|-id=803 bgcolor=#E9E9E9
| 608803 ||  || — || September 21, 2011 || Haleakala || Pan-STARRS ||  || align=right | 1.8 km || 
|-id=804 bgcolor=#d6d6d6
| 608804 ||  || — || November 20, 2009 || Mount Lemmon || Mount Lemmon Survey ||  || align=right | 2.7 km || 
|-id=805 bgcolor=#E9E9E9
| 608805 ||  || — || December 23, 2012 || Haleakala || Pan-STARRS ||  || align=right | 1.7 km || 
|-id=806 bgcolor=#E9E9E9
| 608806 ||  || — || February 20, 2009 || Kitt Peak || Spacewatch ||  || align=right | 1.6 km || 
|-id=807 bgcolor=#E9E9E9
| 608807 ||  || — || January 28, 2004 || Kitt Peak || Spacewatch ||  || align=right | 1.5 km || 
|-id=808 bgcolor=#E9E9E9
| 608808 ||  || — || February 10, 2004 || Palomar || NEAT ||  || align=right | 2.1 km || 
|-id=809 bgcolor=#fefefe
| 608809 ||  || — || January 30, 2004 || Kitt Peak || Spacewatch || H || align=right data-sort-value="0.40" | 400 m || 
|-id=810 bgcolor=#E9E9E9
| 608810 ||  || — || February 10, 2004 || Catalina || CSS ||  || align=right | 2.1 km || 
|-id=811 bgcolor=#E9E9E9
| 608811 ||  || — || February 11, 2004 || Kitt Peak || Spacewatch ||  || align=right | 1.7 km || 
|-id=812 bgcolor=#fefefe
| 608812 ||  || — || February 10, 2004 || Palomar || NEAT ||  || align=right data-sort-value="0.69" | 690 m || 
|-id=813 bgcolor=#E9E9E9
| 608813 ||  || — || January 19, 2004 || Kitt Peak || Spacewatch ||  || align=right | 1.9 km || 
|-id=814 bgcolor=#fefefe
| 608814 ||  || — || February 13, 2004 || Kitt Peak || Spacewatch ||  || align=right data-sort-value="0.68" | 680 m || 
|-id=815 bgcolor=#E9E9E9
| 608815 ||  || — || February 11, 2004 || Kitt Peak || Spacewatch ||  || align=right | 1.8 km || 
|-id=816 bgcolor=#fefefe
| 608816 ||  || — || January 17, 2004 || Palomar || NEAT ||  || align=right | 1.1 km || 
|-id=817 bgcolor=#E9E9E9
| 608817 ||  || — || February 12, 2004 || Kitt Peak || Spacewatch ||  || align=right | 2.2 km || 
|-id=818 bgcolor=#E9E9E9
| 608818 ||  || — || February 11, 2004 || Kitt Peak || Spacewatch ||  || align=right | 2.3 km || 
|-id=819 bgcolor=#E9E9E9
| 608819 ||  || — || August 14, 2006 || Palomar || NEAT ||  || align=right | 2.8 km || 
|-id=820 bgcolor=#fefefe
| 608820 ||  || — || December 25, 2010 || Mount Lemmon || Mount Lemmon Survey ||  || align=right data-sort-value="0.69" | 690 m || 
|-id=821 bgcolor=#fefefe
| 608821 ||  || — || January 20, 2015 || Haleakala || Pan-STARRS ||  || align=right data-sort-value="0.79" | 790 m || 
|-id=822 bgcolor=#fefefe
| 608822 ||  || — || April 27, 2012 || Haleakala || Pan-STARRS || H || align=right data-sort-value="0.43" | 430 m || 
|-id=823 bgcolor=#E9E9E9
| 608823 ||  || — || February 13, 2004 || Kitt Peak || Spacewatch ||  || align=right | 1.5 km || 
|-id=824 bgcolor=#E9E9E9
| 608824 ||  || — || May 4, 2014 || Mount Lemmon || Mount Lemmon Survey ||  || align=right | 1.5 km || 
|-id=825 bgcolor=#E9E9E9
| 608825 ||  || — || January 17, 2013 || Kitt Peak || Spacewatch ||  || align=right | 2.1 km || 
|-id=826 bgcolor=#fefefe
| 608826 ||  || — || February 23, 2015 || Haleakala || Pan-STARRS || H || align=right data-sort-value="0.47" | 470 m || 
|-id=827 bgcolor=#fefefe
| 608827 ||  || — || February 28, 2008 || Kitt Peak || Spacewatch ||  || align=right data-sort-value="0.58" | 580 m || 
|-id=828 bgcolor=#E9E9E9
| 608828 ||  || — || February 17, 2004 || Kitt Peak || Spacewatch ||  || align=right | 2.1 km || 
|-id=829 bgcolor=#d6d6d6
| 608829 ||  || — || February 17, 2004 || Kitt Peak || Spacewatch ||  || align=right | 1.9 km || 
|-id=830 bgcolor=#E9E9E9
| 608830 ||  || — || February 11, 2004 || Palomar || NEAT ||  || align=right | 1.9 km || 
|-id=831 bgcolor=#E9E9E9
| 608831 ||  || — || February 12, 2004 || Kitt Peak || Spacewatch ||  || align=right | 1.7 km || 
|-id=832 bgcolor=#FA8072
| 608832 ||  || — || February 16, 2004 || Kitt Peak || Spacewatch || H || align=right data-sort-value="0.40" | 400 m || 
|-id=833 bgcolor=#E9E9E9
| 608833 ||  || — || February 11, 2004 || Kitt Peak || Spacewatch ||  || align=right | 1.8 km || 
|-id=834 bgcolor=#E9E9E9
| 608834 ||  || — || February 26, 2004 || Kitt Peak || M. W. Buie, D. E. Trilling ||  || align=right | 2.1 km || 
|-id=835 bgcolor=#fefefe
| 608835 ||  || — || February 18, 2004 || Kitt Peak || Spacewatch ||  || align=right data-sort-value="0.78" | 780 m || 
|-id=836 bgcolor=#E9E9E9
| 608836 ||  || — || April 21, 2009 || Mount Lemmon || Mount Lemmon Survey ||  || align=right | 2.1 km || 
|-id=837 bgcolor=#fefefe
| 608837 ||  || — || December 1, 2010 || Mount Lemmon || Mount Lemmon Survey ||  || align=right data-sort-value="0.74" | 740 m || 
|-id=838 bgcolor=#fefefe
| 608838 ||  || — || November 8, 2010 || Mount Lemmon || Mount Lemmon Survey ||  || align=right data-sort-value="0.67" | 670 m || 
|-id=839 bgcolor=#fefefe
| 608839 ||  || — || February 17, 2004 || Kitt Peak || Spacewatch ||  || align=right data-sort-value="0.63" | 630 m || 
|-id=840 bgcolor=#fefefe
| 608840 ||  || — || February 28, 2008 || Mount Lemmon || Mount Lemmon Survey ||  || align=right data-sort-value="0.65" | 650 m || 
|-id=841 bgcolor=#fefefe
| 608841 ||  || — || December 21, 2014 || Mount Lemmon || Mount Lemmon Survey ||  || align=right data-sort-value="0.68" | 680 m || 
|-id=842 bgcolor=#E9E9E9
| 608842 ||  || — || March 19, 2009 || Kitt Peak || Spacewatch ||  || align=right | 2.4 km || 
|-id=843 bgcolor=#fefefe
| 608843 ||  || — || January 27, 2015 || Haleakala || Pan-STARRS ||  || align=right data-sort-value="0.53" | 530 m || 
|-id=844 bgcolor=#E9E9E9
| 608844 ||  || — || October 24, 2011 || Haleakala || Pan-STARRS ||  || align=right | 1.8 km || 
|-id=845 bgcolor=#fefefe
| 608845 ||  || — || April 24, 2008 || Mount Lemmon || Mount Lemmon Survey ||  || align=right data-sort-value="0.82" | 820 m || 
|-id=846 bgcolor=#E9E9E9
| 608846 ||  || — || January 1, 2008 || Kitt Peak || Spacewatch ||  || align=right | 2.5 km || 
|-id=847 bgcolor=#E9E9E9
| 608847 ||  || — || January 21, 2013 || Haleakala || Pan-STARRS ||  || align=right | 2.4 km || 
|-id=848 bgcolor=#fefefe
| 608848 ||  || — || March 27, 2008 || Kitt Peak || Spacewatch ||  || align=right data-sort-value="0.57" | 570 m || 
|-id=849 bgcolor=#E9E9E9
| 608849 ||  || — || September 23, 2011 || Kitt Peak || Spacewatch ||  || align=right | 2.0 km || 
|-id=850 bgcolor=#fefefe
| 608850 ||  || — || March 13, 2004 || Palomar || NEAT ||  || align=right data-sort-value="0.99" | 990 m || 
|-id=851 bgcolor=#E9E9E9
| 608851 ||  || — || March 10, 2004 || Palomar || NEAT ||  || align=right | 2.8 km || 
|-id=852 bgcolor=#fefefe
| 608852 ||  || — || March 11, 2004 || Palomar || NEAT ||  || align=right data-sort-value="0.85" | 850 m || 
|-id=853 bgcolor=#fefefe
| 608853 ||  || — || March 12, 2004 || Andrushivka || Andrushivka Obs. ||  || align=right data-sort-value="0.77" | 770 m || 
|-id=854 bgcolor=#fefefe
| 608854 ||  || — || March 15, 2004 || Kitt Peak || Spacewatch ||  || align=right data-sort-value="0.62" | 620 m || 
|-id=855 bgcolor=#E9E9E9
| 608855 ||  || — || March 14, 2004 || Kitt Peak || Spacewatch ||  || align=right | 2.2 km || 
|-id=856 bgcolor=#d6d6d6
| 608856 ||  || — || March 15, 2004 || Kitt Peak || Spacewatch ||  || align=right | 2.7 km || 
|-id=857 bgcolor=#E9E9E9
| 608857 ||  || — || March 15, 2004 || Kitt Peak || Spacewatch ||  || align=right | 2.0 km || 
|-id=858 bgcolor=#fefefe
| 608858 ||  || — || February 23, 2004 || Socorro || LINEAR || PHO || align=right | 1.00 km || 
|-id=859 bgcolor=#fefefe
| 608859 ||  || — || March 14, 2004 || Kitt Peak || Spacewatch ||  || align=right data-sort-value="0.55" | 550 m || 
|-id=860 bgcolor=#fefefe
| 608860 ||  || — || March 15, 2004 || Kitt Peak || Spacewatch ||  || align=right data-sort-value="0.65" | 650 m || 
|-id=861 bgcolor=#E9E9E9
| 608861 ||  || — || March 15, 2004 || Kitt Peak || Spacewatch ||  || align=right | 1.9 km || 
|-id=862 bgcolor=#E9E9E9
| 608862 ||  || — || March 15, 2004 || Kitt Peak || Spacewatch ||  || align=right | 1.9 km || 
|-id=863 bgcolor=#d6d6d6
| 608863 ||  || — || March 15, 2004 || Kitt Peak || Spacewatch ||  || align=right | 2.1 km || 
|-id=864 bgcolor=#E9E9E9
| 608864 ||  || — || March 15, 2004 || Kitt Peak || Spacewatch ||  || align=right | 1.5 km || 
|-id=865 bgcolor=#E9E9E9
| 608865 ||  || — || February 9, 2013 || Haleakala || Pan-STARRS ||  || align=right | 1.9 km || 
|-id=866 bgcolor=#E9E9E9
| 608866 ||  || — || June 28, 2005 || Kitt Peak || Spacewatch ||  || align=right | 3.4 km || 
|-id=867 bgcolor=#fefefe
| 608867 ||  || — || March 19, 2004 || Palomar || NEAT || H || align=right data-sort-value="0.73" | 730 m || 
|-id=868 bgcolor=#E9E9E9
| 608868 ||  || — || March 17, 2004 || Kitt Peak || Spacewatch ||  || align=right | 2.3 km || 
|-id=869 bgcolor=#fefefe
| 608869 ||  || — || March 17, 2004 || Kitt Peak || Spacewatch ||  || align=right data-sort-value="0.64" | 640 m || 
|-id=870 bgcolor=#E9E9E9
| 608870 ||  || — || March 17, 2004 || Kitt Peak || Spacewatch ||  || align=right | 1.8 km || 
|-id=871 bgcolor=#E9E9E9
| 608871 ||  || — || March 18, 2004 || Socorro || LINEAR ||  || align=right | 2.1 km || 
|-id=872 bgcolor=#fefefe
| 608872 ||  || — || March 26, 2004 || Socorro || LINEAR ||  || align=right data-sort-value="0.77" | 770 m || 
|-id=873 bgcolor=#E9E9E9
| 608873 ||  || — || March 27, 2004 || Kitt Peak || Spacewatch ||  || align=right | 2.1 km || 
|-id=874 bgcolor=#E9E9E9
| 608874 ||  || — || March 23, 2004 || Socorro || LINEAR ||  || align=right | 2.8 km || 
|-id=875 bgcolor=#E9E9E9
| 608875 ||  || — || March 14, 2004 || Palomar || NEAT ||  || align=right | 2.3 km || 
|-id=876 bgcolor=#E9E9E9
| 608876 ||  || — || March 23, 2004 || Catalina || CSS ||  || align=right | 3.5 km || 
|-id=877 bgcolor=#E9E9E9
| 608877 ||  || — || March 16, 2004 || Kitt Peak || Spacewatch ||  || align=right | 1.9 km || 
|-id=878 bgcolor=#fefefe
| 608878 ||  || — || March 16, 2004 || Kitt Peak || Spacewatch ||  || align=right data-sort-value="0.62" | 620 m || 
|-id=879 bgcolor=#E9E9E9
| 608879 ||  || — || March 16, 2004 || Kitt Peak || Spacewatch ||  || align=right | 1.8 km || 
|-id=880 bgcolor=#fefefe
| 608880 ||  || — || March 16, 2004 || Kitt Peak || Spacewatch ||  || align=right data-sort-value="0.81" | 810 m || 
|-id=881 bgcolor=#E9E9E9
| 608881 ||  || — || February 13, 2004 || Kitt Peak || Spacewatch ||  || align=right | 2.4 km || 
|-id=882 bgcolor=#fefefe
| 608882 ||  || — || March 17, 2004 || Kitt Peak || Spacewatch || H || align=right data-sort-value="0.40" | 400 m || 
|-id=883 bgcolor=#fefefe
| 608883 ||  || — || April 15, 2008 || Mount Lemmon || Mount Lemmon Survey ||  || align=right data-sort-value="0.67" | 670 m || 
|-id=884 bgcolor=#E9E9E9
| 608884 ||  || — || September 19, 2006 || Kitt Peak || Spacewatch ||  || align=right | 1.9 km || 
|-id=885 bgcolor=#fefefe
| 608885 ||  || — || November 16, 2006 || Kitt Peak || Spacewatch ||  || align=right data-sort-value="0.47" | 470 m || 
|-id=886 bgcolor=#E9E9E9
| 608886 ||  || — || March 5, 2013 || Mount Lemmon || Mount Lemmon Survey ||  || align=right | 1.7 km || 
|-id=887 bgcolor=#E9E9E9
| 608887 ||  || — || December 22, 2012 || Haleakala || Pan-STARRS ||  || align=right | 2.0 km || 
|-id=888 bgcolor=#E9E9E9
| 608888 ||  || — || January 9, 2013 || Kitt Peak || Spacewatch ||  || align=right | 2.2 km || 
|-id=889 bgcolor=#fefefe
| 608889 ||  || — || October 31, 2010 || Mount Lemmon || Mount Lemmon Survey || H || align=right data-sort-value="0.54" | 540 m || 
|-id=890 bgcolor=#fefefe
| 608890 ||  || — || October 4, 2005 || Mount Lemmon || Mount Lemmon Survey ||  || align=right data-sort-value="0.50" | 500 m || 
|-id=891 bgcolor=#E9E9E9
| 608891 ||  || — || October 28, 2011 || Catalina || CSS ||  || align=right | 2.8 km || 
|-id=892 bgcolor=#E9E9E9
| 608892 ||  || — || October 26, 2011 || Haleakala || Pan-STARRS ||  || align=right | 1.7 km || 
|-id=893 bgcolor=#E9E9E9
| 608893 ||  || — || March 31, 1995 || Kitt Peak || Spacewatch ||  || align=right | 2.1 km || 
|-id=894 bgcolor=#d6d6d6
| 608894 ||  || — || September 24, 2011 || Haleakala || Pan-STARRS ||  || align=right | 1.9 km || 
|-id=895 bgcolor=#E9E9E9
| 608895 ||  || — || January 17, 2013 || Haleakala || Pan-STARRS ||  || align=right | 1.7 km || 
|-id=896 bgcolor=#fefefe
| 608896 ||  || — || August 27, 2016 || Haleakala || Pan-STARRS ||  || align=right data-sort-value="0.60" | 600 m || 
|-id=897 bgcolor=#E9E9E9
| 608897 ||  || — || March 21, 2004 || Kitt Peak || Spacewatch ||  || align=right | 1.7 km || 
|-id=898 bgcolor=#E9E9E9
| 608898 ||  || — || January 16, 2018 || Haleakala || Pan-STARRS ||  || align=right | 1.8 km || 
|-id=899 bgcolor=#E9E9E9
| 608899 ||  || — || December 30, 2007 || Kitt Peak || Spacewatch ||  || align=right | 1.7 km || 
|-id=900 bgcolor=#fefefe
| 608900 ||  || — || February 16, 2015 || Haleakala || Pan-STARRS ||  || align=right data-sort-value="0.57" | 570 m || 
|}

608901–609000 

|-bgcolor=#d6d6d6
| 608901 ||  || — || April 27, 2009 || Mount Lemmon || Mount Lemmon Survey ||  || align=right | 1.9 km || 
|-id=902 bgcolor=#E9E9E9
| 608902 ||  || — || March 18, 2004 || Kitt Peak || Spacewatch ||  || align=right | 1.9 km || 
|-id=903 bgcolor=#fefefe
| 608903 ||  || — || April 11, 2004 || Palomar || NEAT ||  || align=right data-sort-value="0.84" | 840 m || 
|-id=904 bgcolor=#E9E9E9
| 608904 ||  || — || April 11, 2004 || Palomar || NEAT ||  || align=right | 3.0 km || 
|-id=905 bgcolor=#fefefe
| 608905 ||  || — || April 12, 2004 || Palomar || NEAT ||  || align=right data-sort-value="0.72" | 720 m || 
|-id=906 bgcolor=#fefefe
| 608906 ||  || — || April 13, 2004 || Palomar || NEAT || H || align=right data-sort-value="0.63" | 630 m || 
|-id=907 bgcolor=#d6d6d6
| 608907 ||  || — || April 12, 2004 || Kitt Peak || Spacewatch ||  || align=right | 2.6 km || 
|-id=908 bgcolor=#E9E9E9
| 608908 ||  || — || March 16, 2004 || Kitt Peak || Spacewatch ||  || align=right | 1.7 km || 
|-id=909 bgcolor=#E9E9E9
| 608909 ||  || — || April 13, 2004 || Kitt Peak || Spacewatch ||  || align=right | 2.2 km || 
|-id=910 bgcolor=#E9E9E9
| 608910 ||  || — || April 14, 2004 || Kitt Peak || Spacewatch ||  || align=right | 2.4 km || 
|-id=911 bgcolor=#d6d6d6
| 608911 ||  || — || April 15, 2004 || Anderson Mesa || LONEOS ||  || align=right | 1.6 km || 
|-id=912 bgcolor=#fefefe
| 608912 ||  || — || February 13, 2011 || Mount Lemmon || Mount Lemmon Survey ||  || align=right data-sort-value="0.68" | 680 m || 
|-id=913 bgcolor=#E9E9E9
| 608913 ||  || — || September 29, 2011 || Kitt Peak || Spacewatch ||  || align=right | 1.9 km || 
|-id=914 bgcolor=#fefefe
| 608914 ||  || — || October 4, 2013 || Kitt Peak || Spacewatch ||  || align=right data-sort-value="0.65" | 650 m || 
|-id=915 bgcolor=#d6d6d6
| 608915 ||  || — || March 26, 2004 || Kitt Peak || Spacewatch ||  || align=right | 2.1 km || 
|-id=916 bgcolor=#fefefe
| 608916 ||  || — || April 16, 2004 || Kitt Peak || Spacewatch ||  || align=right data-sort-value="0.71" | 710 m || 
|-id=917 bgcolor=#E9E9E9
| 608917 ||  || — || April 24, 2004 || Socorro || LINEAR ||  || align=right | 2.2 km || 
|-id=918 bgcolor=#E9E9E9
| 608918 ||  || — || April 10, 2004 || Palomar || NEAT ||  || align=right | 2.8 km || 
|-id=919 bgcolor=#fefefe
| 608919 ||  || — || April 24, 2004 || Bergisch Gladbach || W. Bickel ||  || align=right data-sort-value="0.72" | 720 m || 
|-id=920 bgcolor=#fefefe
| 608920 ||  || — || August 29, 2009 || Kitt Peak || Spacewatch ||  || align=right data-sort-value="0.78" | 780 m || 
|-id=921 bgcolor=#E9E9E9
| 608921 ||  || — || October 19, 2011 || Mount Lemmon || Mount Lemmon Survey ||  || align=right | 1.9 km || 
|-id=922 bgcolor=#E9E9E9
| 608922 ||  || — || April 27, 2012 || Haleakala || Pan-STARRS ||  || align=right data-sort-value="0.67" | 670 m || 
|-id=923 bgcolor=#E9E9E9
| 608923 ||  || — || September 25, 2006 || Kitt Peak || Spacewatch ||  || align=right | 2.4 km || 
|-id=924 bgcolor=#E9E9E9
| 608924 ||  || — || March 18, 2013 || Mount Lemmon || Mount Lemmon Survey ||  || align=right | 1.7 km || 
|-id=925 bgcolor=#fefefe
| 608925 ||  || — || January 8, 2011 || Mount Lemmon || Mount Lemmon Survey ||  || align=right data-sort-value="0.56" | 560 m || 
|-id=926 bgcolor=#E9E9E9
| 608926 ||  || — || November 4, 2016 || Haleakala || Pan-STARRS ||  || align=right | 2.4 km || 
|-id=927 bgcolor=#fefefe
| 608927 ||  || — || March 15, 2004 || Palomar || NEAT ||  || align=right | 1.2 km || 
|-id=928 bgcolor=#fefefe
| 608928 ||  || — || May 14, 2004 || Kitt Peak || Spacewatch || H || align=right data-sort-value="0.60" | 600 m || 
|-id=929 bgcolor=#d6d6d6
| 608929 ||  || — || May 13, 2004 || Kitt Peak || Spacewatch ||  || align=right | 2.2 km || 
|-id=930 bgcolor=#fefefe
| 608930 ||  || — || October 28, 2008 || Kitt Peak || Spacewatch ||  || align=right data-sort-value="0.60" | 600 m || 
|-id=931 bgcolor=#fefefe
| 608931 ||  || — || January 10, 2011 || Mount Lemmon || Mount Lemmon Survey ||  || align=right data-sort-value="0.87" | 870 m || 
|-id=932 bgcolor=#d6d6d6
| 608932 ||  || — || September 8, 2015 || Haleakala || Pan-STARRS ||  || align=right | 3.1 km || 
|-id=933 bgcolor=#d6d6d6
| 608933 ||  || — || June 11, 2004 || Kitt Peak || Spacewatch ||  || align=right | 2.5 km || 
|-id=934 bgcolor=#d6d6d6
| 608934 ||  || — || June 14, 2004 || Kitt Peak || Spacewatch ||  || align=right | 2.7 km || 
|-id=935 bgcolor=#E9E9E9
| 608935 ||  || — || June 14, 2004 || Kitt Peak || Spacewatch ||  || align=right data-sort-value="0.97" | 970 m || 
|-id=936 bgcolor=#E9E9E9
| 608936 ||  || — || June 11, 2004 || Kitt Peak || Spacewatch ||  || align=right | 1.1 km || 
|-id=937 bgcolor=#fefefe
| 608937 ||  || — || February 23, 2007 || Mount Lemmon || Mount Lemmon Survey ||  || align=right data-sort-value="0.74" | 740 m || 
|-id=938 bgcolor=#E9E9E9
| 608938 ||  || — || December 13, 2006 || Kitt Peak || Spacewatch ||  || align=right | 2.9 km || 
|-id=939 bgcolor=#E9E9E9
| 608939 ||  || — || June 11, 2004 || Kitt Peak || Spacewatch ||  || align=right | 1.00 km || 
|-id=940 bgcolor=#FA8072
| 608940 ||  || — || June 22, 2004 || Kitt Peak || Spacewatch ||  || align=right data-sort-value="0.68" | 680 m || 
|-id=941 bgcolor=#E9E9E9
| 608941 ||  || — || June 15, 2004 || Kitt Peak || Spacewatch ||  || align=right data-sort-value="0.89" | 890 m || 
|-id=942 bgcolor=#E9E9E9
| 608942 ||  || — || July 19, 2004 || Reedy Creek || J. Broughton ||  || align=right data-sort-value="0.84" | 840 m || 
|-id=943 bgcolor=#d6d6d6
| 608943 ||  || — || July 22, 2004 || Mauna Kea || Mauna Kea Obs. ||  || align=right | 2.1 km || 
|-id=944 bgcolor=#fefefe
| 608944 ||  || — || July 16, 2004 || Cerro Tololo || Cerro Tololo Obs. ||  || align=right data-sort-value="0.64" | 640 m || 
|-id=945 bgcolor=#fefefe
| 608945 ||  || — || March 18, 2010 || Mount Lemmon || Mount Lemmon Survey ||  || align=right data-sort-value="0.45" | 450 m || 
|-id=946 bgcolor=#E9E9E9
| 608946 ||  || — || July 17, 2004 || Cerro Tololo || Cerro Tololo Obs. ||  || align=right data-sort-value="0.64" | 640 m || 
|-id=947 bgcolor=#d6d6d6
| 608947 ||  || — || July 17, 2004 || Cerro Tololo || Cerro Tololo Obs. ||  || align=right | 2.2 km || 
|-id=948 bgcolor=#d6d6d6
| 608948 ||  || — || July 22, 2004 || Siding Spring || R. H. McNaught ||  || align=right | 2.1 km || 
|-id=949 bgcolor=#d6d6d6
| 608949 ||  || — || July 16, 2004 || Cerro Tololo || Cerro Tololo Obs. ||  || align=right | 1.6 km || 
|-id=950 bgcolor=#d6d6d6
| 608950 ||  || — || February 7, 2002 || Kitt Peak || Spacewatch ||  || align=right | 3.1 km || 
|-id=951 bgcolor=#E9E9E9
| 608951 ||  || — || August 7, 2004 || Palomar || NEAT ||  || align=right | 1.2 km || 
|-id=952 bgcolor=#E9E9E9
| 608952 ||  || — || August 6, 2004 || Palomar || NEAT ||  || align=right | 1.1 km || 
|-id=953 bgcolor=#d6d6d6
| 608953 ||  || — || August 9, 2004 || Anderson Mesa || LONEOS ||  || align=right | 2.5 km || 
|-id=954 bgcolor=#fefefe
| 608954 ||  || — || August 5, 2004 || Palomar || NEAT ||  || align=right data-sort-value="0.64" | 640 m || 
|-id=955 bgcolor=#d6d6d6
| 608955 ||  || — || August 13, 2004 || Cerro Tololo || Cerro Tololo Obs. ||  || align=right | 2.3 km || 
|-id=956 bgcolor=#E9E9E9
| 608956 ||  || — || December 6, 2005 || Kitt Peak || Spacewatch ||  || align=right data-sort-value="0.79" | 790 m || 
|-id=957 bgcolor=#d6d6d6
| 608957 ||  || — || August 23, 2004 || Kitt Peak || Spacewatch ||  || align=right | 2.5 km || 
|-id=958 bgcolor=#fefefe
| 608958 ||  || — || February 16, 2013 || Kitt Peak || Spacewatch ||  || align=right data-sort-value="0.48" | 480 m || 
|-id=959 bgcolor=#d6d6d6
| 608959 ||  || — || August 14, 2004 || Cerro Tololo || Cerro Tololo Obs. ||  || align=right | 1.9 km || 
|-id=960 bgcolor=#d6d6d6
| 608960 ||  || — || August 23, 2004 || Kitt Peak || Spacewatch ||  || align=right | 1.9 km || 
|-id=961 bgcolor=#fefefe
| 608961 ||  || — || August 25, 2004 || Wrightwood || J. Bauer ||  || align=right data-sort-value="0.68" | 680 m || 
|-id=962 bgcolor=#d6d6d6
| 608962 ||  || — || October 29, 2010 || Mount Lemmon || Mount Lemmon Survey ||  || align=right | 2.8 km || 
|-id=963 bgcolor=#d6d6d6
| 608963 ||  || — || November 5, 2005 || Kitt Peak || Spacewatch ||  || align=right | 3.2 km || 
|-id=964 bgcolor=#fefefe
| 608964 ||  || — || August 22, 2004 || Kitt Peak || Spacewatch ||  || align=right data-sort-value="0.62" | 620 m || 
|-id=965 bgcolor=#fefefe
| 608965 ||  || — || January 26, 2014 || Haleakala || Pan-STARRS ||  || align=right data-sort-value="0.89" | 890 m || 
|-id=966 bgcolor=#E9E9E9
| 608966 ||  || — || November 27, 2009 || Mount Lemmon || Mount Lemmon Survey ||  || align=right data-sort-value="0.80" | 800 m || 
|-id=967 bgcolor=#E9E9E9
| 608967 ||  || — || July 29, 2008 || Mount Lemmon || Mount Lemmon Survey ||  || align=right data-sort-value="0.94" | 940 m || 
|-id=968 bgcolor=#d6d6d6
| 608968 ||  || — || October 31, 2010 || Mount Lemmon || Mount Lemmon Survey ||  || align=right | 2.0 km || 
|-id=969 bgcolor=#d6d6d6
| 608969 ||  || — || October 28, 2010 || Mount Lemmon || Mount Lemmon Survey ||  || align=right | 1.9 km || 
|-id=970 bgcolor=#E9E9E9
| 608970 ||  || — || August 6, 2012 || Haleakala || Pan-STARRS ||  || align=right data-sort-value="0.87" | 870 m || 
|-id=971 bgcolor=#d6d6d6
| 608971 ||  || — || August 25, 2004 || Kitt Peak || Spacewatch ||  || align=right | 2.2 km || 
|-id=972 bgcolor=#E9E9E9
| 608972 ||  || — || March 13, 2007 || Mount Lemmon || Mount Lemmon Survey ||  || align=right data-sort-value="0.82" | 820 m || 
|-id=973 bgcolor=#d6d6d6
| 608973 ||  || — || November 12, 2010 || Mount Lemmon || Mount Lemmon Survey ||  || align=right | 2.0 km || 
|-id=974 bgcolor=#d6d6d6
| 608974 ||  || — || August 23, 2004 || Kitt Peak || Spacewatch ||  || align=right | 1.7 km || 
|-id=975 bgcolor=#d6d6d6
| 608975 ||  || — || September 5, 2004 || Klet || J. Tichá, M. Tichý ||  || align=right | 2.3 km || 
|-id=976 bgcolor=#d6d6d6
| 608976 ||  || — || September 6, 2004 || Needville || Needville Obs. ||  || align=right | 2.2 km || 
|-id=977 bgcolor=#d6d6d6
| 608977 ||  || — || September 8, 2004 || Socorro || LINEAR ||  || align=right | 2.0 km || 
|-id=978 bgcolor=#FA8072
| 608978 ||  || — || September 6, 2004 || Vail-Jarnac || Jarnac Obs. ||  || align=right data-sort-value="0.68" | 680 m || 
|-id=979 bgcolor=#fefefe
| 608979 ||  || — || September 8, 2004 || Palomar || NEAT ||  || align=right data-sort-value="0.70" | 700 m || 
|-id=980 bgcolor=#d6d6d6
| 608980 ||  || — || September 8, 2004 || Socorro || LINEAR ||  || align=right | 3.6 km || 
|-id=981 bgcolor=#d6d6d6
| 608981 ||  || — || August 25, 2004 || Kitt Peak || Spacewatch ||  || align=right | 2.6 km || 
|-id=982 bgcolor=#d6d6d6
| 608982 ||  || — || August 10, 2004 || Socorro || LINEAR ||  || align=right | 2.5 km || 
|-id=983 bgcolor=#E9E9E9
| 608983 ||  || — || August 25, 2004 || Kitt Peak || Spacewatch ||  || align=right data-sort-value="0.99" | 990 m || 
|-id=984 bgcolor=#d6d6d6
| 608984 ||  || — || September 7, 2004 || Kitt Peak || Spacewatch ||  || align=right | 2.0 km || 
|-id=985 bgcolor=#fefefe
| 608985 ||  || — || September 7, 2004 || Kitt Peak || Spacewatch ||  || align=right data-sort-value="0.92" | 920 m || 
|-id=986 bgcolor=#d6d6d6
| 608986 ||  || — || September 7, 2004 || Kitt Peak || Spacewatch ||  || align=right | 1.9 km || 
|-id=987 bgcolor=#fefefe
| 608987 ||  || — || September 7, 2004 || Kitt Peak || Spacewatch ||  || align=right data-sort-value="0.52" | 520 m || 
|-id=988 bgcolor=#fefefe
| 608988 ||  || — || September 7, 2004 || Kitt Peak || Spacewatch ||  || align=right data-sort-value="0.44" | 440 m || 
|-id=989 bgcolor=#d6d6d6
| 608989 ||  || — || September 7, 2004 || Kitt Peak || Spacewatch ||  || align=right | 2.2 km || 
|-id=990 bgcolor=#d6d6d6
| 608990 ||  || — || September 7, 2004 || Kitt Peak || Spacewatch ||  || align=right | 2.1 km || 
|-id=991 bgcolor=#E9E9E9
| 608991 ||  || — || September 7, 2004 || Kitt Peak || Spacewatch ||  || align=right data-sort-value="0.73" | 730 m || 
|-id=992 bgcolor=#d6d6d6
| 608992 ||  || — || September 7, 2004 || Kitt Peak || Spacewatch ||  || align=right | 2.3 km || 
|-id=993 bgcolor=#d6d6d6
| 608993 ||  || — || September 7, 2004 || Kitt Peak || Spacewatch ||  || align=right | 1.5 km || 
|-id=994 bgcolor=#d6d6d6
| 608994 ||  || — || September 7, 2004 || Kitt Peak || Spacewatch ||  || align=right | 1.9 km || 
|-id=995 bgcolor=#E9E9E9
| 608995 ||  || — || September 7, 2004 || Palomar || NEAT ||  || align=right | 1.4 km || 
|-id=996 bgcolor=#E9E9E9
| 608996 ||  || — || September 8, 2004 || Socorro || LINEAR ||  || align=right | 1.3 km || 
|-id=997 bgcolor=#E9E9E9
| 608997 ||  || — || September 8, 2004 || Socorro || LINEAR ||  || align=right | 1.1 km || 
|-id=998 bgcolor=#d6d6d6
| 608998 ||  || — || September 12, 1994 || Kitt Peak || Spacewatch ||  || align=right | 2.3 km || 
|-id=999 bgcolor=#fefefe
| 608999 ||  || — || September 8, 2004 || Socorro || LINEAR ||  || align=right data-sort-value="0.56" | 560 m || 
|-id=000 bgcolor=#fefefe
| 609000 ||  || — || September 10, 2004 || Socorro || LINEAR ||  || align=right data-sort-value="0.53" | 530 m || 
|}

References

External links 
 Discovery Circumstances: Numbered Minor Planets (605001)–(610000) (IAU Minor Planet Center)

0608